= List of CIGS companies =

List of notable companies manufacturing copper indium gallium selenide solar cells (CIGS):

- Ascent Solar Technologies
- Avancis (former subsidiary of Saint Gobain)
- Miasolé
- Midsummer AB (Swedish manufacturer of CIGS solar modules and sputtering equipment for thin-film solar cells)
- Sunflare
- Sunplugged
- Solar Cloth

Former companies or companies that no longer produce CIGS modules:

- Flisom (founded in 2005 as a spin-off company of ETH Zürich, Switzerland)
- Global Solar Energy (module producer, US-based subsidiary of Hanergy)
- GSHK Solar (module producer, HK-based)
- Hanergy-Solibro (former subsidiary of Q-Cells)
- HelioVolt
- IBM
- International Solar Electric Technology
- Nanosolar
- Nice (former Manz / Würth Solar)
- Odersun
- Siva Power
- Solar Frontier (subsidiary of Showa Shell Sekiyu)
- Solarion
- Soltecture (previously Sulfurcell)
- Solyndra
- Stion
- TSMC Solar (subsidiary of Taiwan Semiconductor Manufacturing)
- Veeco Instruments Inc

== See also ==
- Category:Thin-film cell manufacturers
- Copper indium gallium selenide solar cells (CIGS technology)
- Copper indium gallium selenide (CIGS absorber material)
- List of photovoltaics companies
- Solar cell
- Thin film solar cell
