= Odersun =

Odersun AG
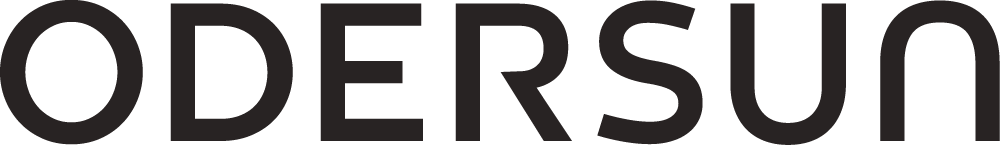
- Company type: Public (Aktiengesellschaft)
- Industry: Photovoltaics
- Founded: 14 November 2002
- Defunct: June 1, 2012
- Headquarters: Frankfurt (Oder), Germany
- Products: CIGS cells, thin-film PV technology
- Number of employees: 320 (2011)
- Website: www.odersun.com

Odersun was a German photovoltaic (PV) company that developed and manufactured CIGS cells on a flexible copper backing, specifically designed for building-integrated photovoltaics.

== History ==
The insolvent company went into administration on 1 June 2012 and filed for bankruptcy.

Odersun employed more than 320 people in production, research and management in Frankfurt an der Oder, Fürstenwalde and Berlin, Germany. In cooperation with partner and investor AT&M, the company was setting up a joint venture in Beijing, China.

The company produced its flexible photovoltaic modules according to a proprietary and patented manufacturing process. These thin-film modules converted sunlight into electricity using a thin layer of a copper indium gallium selenide (CIGS) semiconductor which was deposited on copper tape. These were cut, interconnected and built into different forms of modules depending on their application such as facades, roofs, canopies or louvers.

In 2008, the company topped the inaugural Guardian/Library House "CleanTech 100" list, which showcased the then best companies in European clean technology.

== See also ==
- Copper tape
- List of CIGS companies
