= CIGS =

CIGS may refer to:

- Chief of the General Staff (United Kingdom), a pre-1964 military position in the British Army
- Copper indium gallium selenide, a semiconductor material
  - CIGS solar cell, a solar cell technology using CIGS as its absorber material
- Centro de Instrução de Guerra na Selva, a Brazilian Army jungle training center and combat school located in Manaus

== See also ==
- Cigarette
