= HelioVolt =

Former solar energy company

HelioVolt Corporation
- Type: Private
- Industry: Photovoltaics
- Founded: 2001
- Founder: Dr. B.J. Stanbery
- Defunct: 2014
- Headquarters: Austin, Texas, United States
- Key people: Dr. B.J. Stanbery; Steve Darnell; John Prater; Dr. Peter Hersh; Dr. Bao Sang
- Products: CIGS solar cells
- Website: www.heliovolt.net

HelioVolt Corporation was a privately held solar energy company based in Austin, Texas that suspended operations in 2014. The company manufactured photovoltaic (PV) solar modules using a thin film semiconductor process based on copper indium gallium selenide (CIGS) to produce CIGS solar cells. HelioVolt manufactured these thin film modules for commercial rooftop, utility-scale ground mount, residential, building-integrated photovoltaics (BIPV) and custom installations. The company raised over $230 million in investments, including over $80 million by SK Group.

== History ==
HelioVolt Corporation was founded in 2001 to develop and commercialize its FASST® process for applying CIGS thin-film photovoltaics directly onto conventional construction materials. The company’s FASST® process, based on semiconductor printing, was conceived by HelioVolt founder Dr. Billy J. Stanbery, an expert in the materials science of CIGS and related compound semiconductors. FASST® is a patented manufacturing process for CIGS synthesis.

HelioVolt produced thin film solar PV modules for commercial rooftop, utility-scale ground mount, residential, BIPV and custom installations. HelioVolt suspended operations in 2014 and the contents of the Austin facility were auctioned in January 2015.

== Investments ==
Large-scale investment in HelioVolt began with $8 million in Series A funding from New Enterprise Associates in 2005. A further $77 million was added in a Series B funding round co-led by Paladin Capital Group and the Masdar Clean Tech Fund in August 2007. The Series B funding round was closed for a total of $101 million in October 2007 with investments from Sequel Venture Partners, Noventi, and Passport Capital. The latest investment will fund factory expansion preparation activities.

== Technology ==
HelioVolt developed a new way to manufacture thin-film CIGS semiconductor coatings for solar panels, based on research into the fundamental device physics of the CIGS semiconductor material. However, this solar thin-film processing method was flawed and failed to scale economically, leading to the company's demise in 2014. The contents of the Austin facility were auctioned in January 2015. Conventional semiconductor processing requires a vacuum process to deposit the semiconductor film on the substrate. The need for vacuum chambers makes this a lengthy batch-oriented production process. HelioVolt developed a nanomaterial-based coating that could be sprayed onto a wide variety of substrates without requiring a vacuum. Non-vacuum or atmospheric deposition processes offer a combination of lower costs, process simplicity and reduced manufacturing times. The company's FASST manufacturing process won a Nanotech Briefs "Nano 50" nanotechnology award in 2006. In 2008, HelioVolt and NREL won an R&D 100 Award for their innovative Thin Film Solar Printing Process, as well as the year's coveted R&D Magazine's Editor’s Choice for Most Revolutionary Technology.

HelioVolt produced thin film solar cells that could convert 14% of the sunlight that hit them into electricity, and solar modules with conversion efficiencies of above 12 percent, as certified by NREL.
