= Global Solar Energy =

Company

- Company type: Subsidiary
- Industry: Solar energy
- Founded: 1996
- Founder: Tucson Electric
- Headquarters: Tucson, Arizona, United States
- Products: CIGS solar cells, thin-film PV technology
- Parent: Hanergy
- Website: www.globalsolar.com

Global Solar Energy is a US-based manufacturer of CIGS solar cells, a thin-film based photovoltaic technology, with manufacturing operations in Tucson, Arizona, United States, and Berlin, Germany. In 2013, it was bought by Chinese renewable energy company Hanergy.

== Technology ==
The company uses copper indium gallium diselenide to produce CIGS cells, which achieve up to 19.9% efficiency in laboratory samples, and production cells of about 10.5 to 11 percent average efficiency. This type of solar cell is ideal for portable power and is 1.5 to 2X greater in performance than comparable thin film flexible solar materials.

== Mass production ==
Global Solar Energy opened in 1996, and in 2008 finished another phase of development as it expanded its CIGS production to a new 40 MW facility in Tucson, Arizona and a second 35 MW facility in Berlin, Germany.

The company expects to produce 20 megawatts of the films at the plant in 2008 before ramping up to 40 megawatts of capacity in 2009 and 140 megawatts by 2010. This makes Global Solar the largest full-scale manufacturer of CIGS thin-film photovoltaics.

== Installations ==
Global Solar Energy operates the largest CIGS solar electric array in the world, a 750 kW system located at the company's manufacturing facility in Tucson. Part of the energy harnessed by this array is being purchased by the factory itself.

== Competitors ==
With the advances in conventional crystalline silicon (c-Si) technology in recent years, and the falling cost of the polysilicon feedstock, that followed after a period of severe global shortage, pressure increased on manufacturers of commercial thin-film technologies, including amorphous thin-film silicon (a-Si), cadmium telluride (CdTe), and copper indium gallium diselenide (CIGS), leading to the bankruptcy of several companies. Some current competitors are:

- Siva Power, a US Department of Energy awarded company that is operating in San Jose, CA.
- GSHK Solar has noted that it can produce CIGS cells with a 12.5 percent and an average efficiency of 10 percent in full production efficiency.
- IBM has reported 12% efficiency for its CIS solar cells.

== See also ==
- First Solar
- Miasolé
