= Indium acetylacetonate =

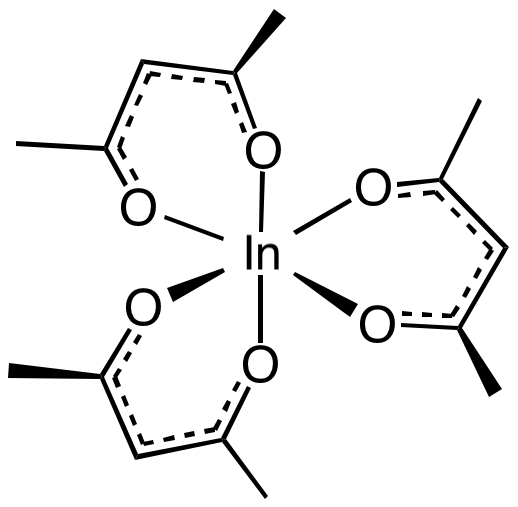

Names
- IUPAC name (Z)-4-Bis{[(Z)-4-oxopent-2-en-2-yl]oxy}indiganyloxypent-3-en-2-one

Identifiers
CAS Number	14405-45-9
3D model (JSmol)	Interactive image
ChemSpider	17617407
ECHA InfoCard	100.034.874
EC Number	238-378-6
PubChem CID	16687813
UNII	9U75RH2FEI
CompTox Dashboard (EPA)	DTXSID70904288
- InChI: InChI=1S/3C5H8O2.In/c3*1-4(6)3-5(2)7;/h3*3,6H,1-2H3;/q;;;+3/p-3/b3*4-3-; Key: SKWCWFYBFZIXHE-LNTINUHCSA-K
- SMILES: CC(=CC(=O)C)O[In](OC(=CC(=O)C)C)OC(=CC(=O)C)C

Properties
Chemical formula	C_{15}H_{21}InO_{6}
Molar mass	412.145 g·mol^{−1}
Appearance	white
Density	1.52 g/cm^{3}
- Except where otherwise noted, data are given for materials in their standard state (at 25 °C [77 °F], 100 kPa). Infobox references

Indium acetylacetonate, also known as In(acac)_{3}, is a compound with formula In(C_{5}H_{7}O_{2})_{3}. It is a colorless solid. It adopts an octahedral structure.

== Uses ==
Indium acetylacetonate and tin(II) acetylacetonate can be used to prepare indium tin oxide thin films with an atmospheric‐pressure chemical vapor deposition method. The resulting thin films are transparent and conductive, with a thickness of about 200 nanometers. Copper indium gallium diselenide (CIGS) can also be produced with indium acetylacetonate. Thin-film CIGS solar cells are synthesized with atomic layer chemical vapour deposition (ALCVD) using In(acac)_{3} and hydrogen sulfide.
