= Manz =

German engineering company

Manz AG
- Company type: Aktiengesellschaft
- Traded as: FWB: M5Z
- Industry: High-tech engineering
- Founded: 1987
- Headquarters: Reutlingen, Germany
- Key people: Dr. Ulrich Brahms (CEO), Heiko Aurenz (Chairman of the supervisory board), Dieter Manz (Founder and member of the supervisory board)
- Products: Integrated production lines for displays, touch panels, PCBs, lithium-ion batteries
- Revenue: €249 million (2023)
- Operating income: €2.9 million (2023)
- Net income: €−2.4 million (2023)
- Total assets: €278.6 million (end 2023)
- Total equity: €99.7 million (end 2023)
- Number of employees: 1,435 (end 2023)
- Website: www.manz.com

Manz AG (formerly Manz Automation) is a German multinational engineering company active in the fields of automation, laser processesing, metrology, wet chemistry and roll-to-roll processing. Manz AG bundles its activities into two reporting segments: Mobility & Battery Solutions and Industry Solutions. The focus in the Mobility & Battery Solutions segment is on production of lithium-ion batteries. The Industry Solutions reporting segment is responsible for assembly and production of electronic components and devices, power and consumer electronics, and components for the electric powertrain.

Headquartered in Reutlingen, Baden-Württemberg, the company has additional production centres in Tübingen as well as international manufacturing sites in Hungary, Italy, Slovakia, China and Taiwan. There are additional sales and service branches in the United States, South Korea and India.

Manz had developed a significant presence in the solar photovoltaic industry. Its activities in this sector focused on the development and supply of integrated systems for the production of CIGS thin-film solar modules. In 2010 the company established a partnership with Würth Solar (part of the Würth industrial group) for the exclusive licensing of its CIGS solar cell production technology. After the acquisition of the CIGS modules innovation line of Würth Solar in January 2012, technology licenses were also transferred to the company on an unrestricted basis. In September 2012, Manz presented a CIGS solar module, which was produced on a mass production line and has a 14.6 percent efficiency on total module area and 15.9 percent on aperture area (one in the industry unequaled efficiency). In April 2015, Manz surpassed these numbers again and presented an impressive new efficiency world record for CIGS thin-film solar modules on mass production line with a module efficiency of 16 percent.

The major business areas of Manz are the supply of systems for the production of flat panel displays and touch panels, a market it first entered in 1994, Printed Circuit Boards, electronic devices, such as smartphones, tablet computers and laptops as well as the supply of systems for the production of lithium-ion batteries on an industrial scale for e.g. e-mobility.

== History ==
The company was founded by Dieter Manz as the GmbH Manz Automatisierungstechnik in 1987. It initially focused on industrial automation and robotics, and today continues to supply automated systems as part of a broader range of products. In October 2001 Manz Automatisierungstechnik merged with ACS GmbH, another firm founded by Dieter Manz, forming Manz Automation AG.
As Manz has grown from an automation specialist into a supplier of integrated production lines, the company changed its name from Manz Automation AG to Manz AG in June 2011.

The company listed on the Frankfurt Stock Exchange in 2006, moving to its Prime Standard market segment in 2008. The company was a constituent of the TecDAX index between September 2008 and March 2009, and again between September 2009 and March 2011. Manz AG shared back in the TecDAX as of March 24, 2014.

In May 2016 Shanghai Electric company took over 19.67% of Manz shares.

In May 2022 Daimler Truck AG acquired a stake in Manz as part of a strategic partnership.

=== Acquisitions and location expansion ===
On 1 January 2008, with the acquisition of the company Christian Majer in Tübingen, Germany (machines for packaging and film processing), the basis for entry into the lithium-ion battery market in 2009 was set. Also in 2008, Manz Slovakia was founded and Intech Machines (Taiwanese market leader for wet chemical processes in manufacturing displays) was absorbed. Manz also established a vacuum coating technology development centre (Manz Coating GmbH in Karlstein, Germany) in 2010. In 2012 the establishment of Manz CIGS Technology GmbH in Schwäbisch Hall, Germany and the opening of a new manufacturing facility in Suzhou (China) took place. With the acquisition of the mechanical engineering division of Kemet Electronics Italy (formerly Arcotronics) in 2014, Manz enlarged its technology portfolio in the battery division and founded Manz Italy. In 2015 Manz acquired KLEO, a specialist for laser direct imaging (LDI), from the ZEISS Group.

== See also ==
- List of CIGS companies
