= Ascent Solar =

Solar panels company in Colorado

Ascent Solar Technologies, Inc.
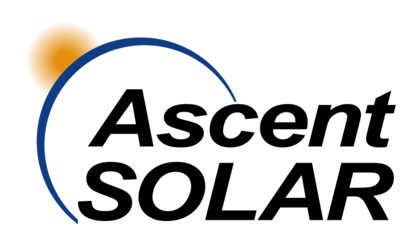
- Type: Public
- Traded as: Nasdaq: ASTI
- Industry: Photovoltaics, solar energy
- Founded: 2005; 21 years ago
- Headquarters: Thornton, Colorado, United States
- Key people: Paul Warley (CEO)
- Revenue: ▲US$7 million (2013)
- Operating income: ▼US$-6M (2013)
- Net income: ▼US$−$6 million (2013)
- Total assets: ▼US$61.4 million (2013)
- Total equity: ▼US$50.0 million (2013)
- Number of employees: 150 (YE 2013)
- Website: www.ascentsolar.com

Ascent Solar Technologies, Inc. is a publicly traded photovoltaic (PV) company located in Thornton, Colorado. Its primary product is a flexible CIGS solar cell on a plastic substrate.

== Technology ==
Ascent Solar's thin-film solar modules are manufactured from CIGS cells using copper indium gallium (di)selenide semiconductor (CIGS), which has shown a 10.5% NREL efficiency in real-world conditions. What makes this proprietary technology unique, however, is its relative size, weight and flexibility: Ascent's CIGS panels currently allow for 85 watts/meter, and 48 watts/kg, thereby giving them the greatest power density and weight ratio among available flexible photovoltaic products by a significant margin. This allows for the efficient use of solar power in a range of new contexts, in which size or weight restrictions have previously rendered solar power impracticable, such as cell phones, airplanes, unmanned vehicles, consumer electronics, railways, space programs, and off-grid applications. This developing technology was selected as one of the "100 Most Innovative Technologies for 2010" by R&D Magazine, and as one of the "50 Best Inventions of 2011" by Time magazine.

== Market history ==
Ascent Solar entered the manufacturing stage for its products in 2013, in part by teaming up with a range of other companies like TFG Radiant (for integrating these materials into a range of building and construction materials), Foxconn (for a "pilot project" at the Zhengzhou factory, which was then manufacturing the iPhone 5), and Bye Aerospace (for solar-powered unmanned aircraft).

=== Consumer products ===
In June 2012 Ascent Solar launched the EnerPlex consumer brand and their first product, a solar power enabled phone case for iPhone 4. In October 2013 the company expanded beyond phone chargers and introduced the Packr solar enabled backpack.

In October 2016 the Association of Marketing & Communication Professionals (AMCP) recognized the EnerPlex brand with 3 MARCOM awards for excellence in retail marketing.

On February 27, 2017, Ascent Solar announced that it had sold the EnerPlex brand and all related non-solar intellectual property rights to Hong Kong–based Sun Pleasure Co. Ltd in order to "focus on its core strength in the high-value specialty PV market".

== Corporate history ==
Ascent Solar was founded in 2005 by ITN Energy Systems, a company engaged in commercializing emerging energy technologies through spin-offs and joint ventures. During the first few years of operation, its primary focus was developing CIGS thin-film technology and efficient methods of manufacturing it.

On July 18, 2006, Ascent completed its IPO, releasing 3,000,000 shares at $5.50 per share. In June 2007, Norsk Hydro ASA, a Norwegian based supplier of aluminum products, entered into a deal with Ascent whereby it purchased 23% of Ascent shares with the option to increase that stake to up to 35%, which it did on October 7, 2008. On September 22, 2008, Ascent's then CEO, Matthew Foster, stepped down from his position. His reason for doing so was cited as an agreement between him and the company as the company changed from research-driven to production-driven. He will remain with Ascent as a consultant for an additional year after his retirement date. On March 11, 2009, Ascent Solar commenced regular production at their facility in Colorado. The company began with a one-shift production schedule. In September 2022, the company announced Jeffery Max as new CEO

In April 2023, Ascent announced they will be acquiring Flisom AG, a developer of lightweight flexible thin film solar modules based in Zurich, Switzerland.

== See also ==
- List of CIGS companies
