= Stion =

Stion Corporation
- Industry: Solar Energy Manufacturing
- Founded: 2006
- Defunct: 2017
- Website: http://www.stion.com

The Stion Corporation was a solar company based in the United States with headquarters in San Jose, CA and manufacturing in Hattiesburg, MS. Founded in 2006, Stion developed thin-film solar panels. The company was majority backed by Khosla Ventures. Stion also provided turn-key solar systems for end users of electricity through its vertically integrated development arm, Stion Energy Services. The company ceased operations in 2017 citing foreign competition.

== Manufacturing ==
Stion developed thin-film CIGS solar modules manufactured in Hattiesburg, MS. With a capacity of 150 megawatts of annual production the plant was the first thin-film solar solar factory in the Southeast US. Stion began manufacturing in 2011. Stion panels were manufactured using glass on glass and a monolithically integrated solar cell. Stion produced both framed and frameless modules which had been used for residential, commercial, utility and off-grid applications.

== Dissolution ==
In 2017 Stion confirmed reports that it would be discontinuing operations. The company blamed "intense, non-market competition from foreign solar panel manufacturers, especially those based in China and proxy countries" for its cessation of operations. Stion announced that it would it would close its Hattiesburg, MS plant on December 13, 2017, laying off 137 employees in the process. By 2020 the Stion company was being referred to as "defunct" In this year the State of Mississippi settled a case against the vestiges of Stion for $2.5 million, after the state's Development Authority had earlier lent the company $75 million which had not been repaid.
