= Sulfurcell =

German solar cell company

German company Sulfurcell was founded in 2001 in Berlin for developing and producing thin film solar cells based on copper indium sulfide (CIS) technology. The venture capital backed company was voted sixth on the 2008 inaugural Guardian/Library House "CleanTech 100" list, which showcased the best in European clean technology companies. The company was renamed into Soltecture in 2009. On 9 May 2012, Soltecture went into administration.

== See also ==
- List of CIGS companies
- List of solar cell manufacturers
