= International Solar Electric Technology =

International Solar Electric Technology, Inc.
- Company type: Private
- Industry: Solar Energy
- Founded: 24 March 1985
- Founder: Dr. Vijay K. Kapur; Dr. Bulent M. Basol; Mr. Eric Tseng
- Defunct: 2016
- Headquarters: Chatsworth, California, U.S.
- Key people: Vijay K. Kapur (CEO); Richard Kemmerle
- Products: Solar panels
- Website: isetinc.com

International Solar Electric Technology, or ISET, was a company invested in copper indium gallium selenide (CIGS) photovoltaics. ISET's research over two decades had been largely funded by grants from the National Renewable Energy Laboratory. Members helped found or worked in many of the more well known CIGS companies, such as Nanosolar, Solopower, Showa, and Honda Soltec Despite a lack of venture capital, ISET planned to launch a thin film, produced in a new Chatsworth plant with hundreds of megawatts per year capacity after the pilot plant is proven. The company believed they will be able to at first achieve 10% efficient modules sold for $0.65 per watt, then 15% efficient for $0.50 per watt, and potentially ultimately as low as $0.40 per watt (a tenth of current prices).

== See also ==
- List of CIGS companies
