= Siva Power =

American solar power company

Siva Power, Inc.
- Company type: Private
- Founded: 2006 (Solexant), restarted in 2013 (Siva Power)
- Headquarters: Santa Clara, California, U.S.A
- Key people: Bruce Sohn (CEO); Mark Heising (chairman); BJ Stanbery (CSO); Markus Beck (CTO)
- Website: www.sivapower.com

Siva Power, Inc. was an American solar power company that developed thin-film technology. The company designed and manufactured copper indium gallium deselenide (CIGS) photovoltaics.

Siva Power was based in San Jose, California. Bruce Sohn was CEO and Mark Heising was chairman.

== History ==
The company was founded in 2006 as Solexant (one of the founders was Paul Alivisatos) and was developing cadmium telluride (CdTe) technology to create solar panels. After the Chinese began dumping silicon solar panels and the American thin-film market worsened, the company decided to pivot and in 2011 hired Brad Mattson to take Solexant in a new direction, which he restarted in 2012. Mattson put the company into stealth mode and ramped up the R&D budget to find a different technology and process for manufacturing solar modules. In 2013 the company reemerged as Siva Power, developing CIGS photovoltaic technology.

As of June 24, 2022 the website is no longer active, and is shown as expiring on August 21, 2021. An article in PV Magazine includes Siva Power as having failed in October 2019.

== Technology ==
Siva Power's deposition technique is Rapid Thermal co-evaporation, which deposits the CIGS compound alloy film by direct reactive condensation of vapors of its constituent elements (copper, indium, gallium, and selenium) onto the substrate, for which Siva Power uses glass. Siva Power has said its initial production capacity of a single line would be 400 megawatts of modules per annum, whereas typical pilot production lines tend to be 5 to 30 megawatts.

== Department of Energy SunShot Initiative award ==
In 2014, Siva Power won the US Department of Energy SunShot Initiative award under the SunShot SolarMat2 category for driving down the cost of manufacturing and implementing efficiency-increasing technology in manufacturing processes for solar modules. The manufacturing component Siva Power plans to build through the SunShot award are designed to have a 12x higher areal (e.g.: m2/min) manufacturing throughput than other CIGS deposition tools, enabling a fully automated CIGS deposition system at a 3x reduction in capex, labor, and overhead cost.

== Funding and acquisitions ==
When the company was Solexant and developing CdTe technology, it had raised $60M over 3 rounds of venture funding from X Seed Capital, Acero Capital (formerly Olympus Capital), Medley Partners, Birchmere Ventures, Trident Capital, Firelake Capital, and DBL Investors. In 2011, Solexant acquired Wakonda, a solar startup based in New York.

The company was recapitalized with $7M in 2015 in series D preferred equity investments from DBL, Medley, Acero and the city of Wuxi, China. In 2016, the company added $5M more to the series D investment. A $25M Series E round, led by Renaissance Technologies hedge fund manager Jim Simons, was closed in May 2017 for the purpose of funding a pilot line.
