= Copper indium gallium selenide solar cell =

Type of thin-film photovoltaic cell

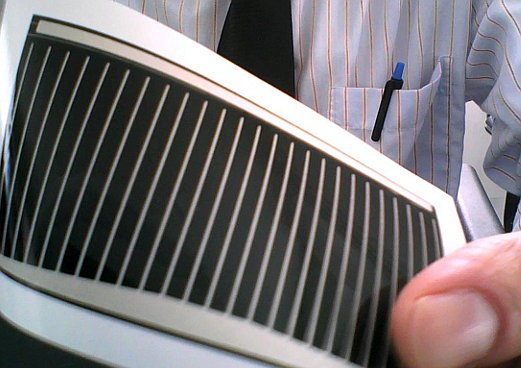
CIGS cell on a flexible plastic backing. Other architectures use rigid CIGS panels sandwiched between two panes of glass.

A copper indium gallium selenide solar cell (CIGS cell, sometimes CI(G)S or CIS cell) is a type of thin-film solar cell. It is manufactured by depositing a thin layer of copper indium gallium selenide solid solution on glass or plastic backing, along with electrodes on the front and back to collect electric current. Because the material has a high absorption coefficient and strongly absorbs sunlight, a much thinner film is required than of other semiconductor materials.

CIGS is one of three mainstream thin-film photovoltaic (PV) technologies, the other two being cadmium telluride and amorphous silicon. Like these materials, CIGS layers are thin enough to be flexible, allowing them to be deposited on flexible substrates. However, as all of these technologies normally use high-temperature deposition techniques, the best performance normally comes from cells deposited on glass, even though advances in low-temperature deposition of CIGS cells have erased much of this performance difference. CIGS outperforms polysilicon at the cell level, however its module efficiency is still lower, due to a less mature upscaling.

Thin-film market share is stagnated at around 15 percent, leaving the rest of the PV market to conventional solar cells made of crystalline silicon. In 2013, the market share of CIGS alone was about 2 percent and all thin-film technologies combined fell below 10 percent. CIGS cells continue being developed, as they promise to reach silicon-like efficiencies, while maintaining their low costs, as is typical for thin-film technology. Prominent manufacturers of CIGS photovoltaics were the later bankrupted companies Nanosolar and Solyndra. The market leader is the Japanese company Solar Frontier, with Global Solar and Group Solar Hong Kong (GSHK Solar) also producing solar modules free of any heavy metals such as cadmium and/or lead. Many CIGS solar panel manufacturer companies have gone bankrupt.

== Properties ==
CIGS is a I-III-VI_{2} compound semiconductor material composed of copper, indium, gallium, and selenium. The material is a solid solution of copper indium selenide (often abbreviated "CIS") and copper gallium selenide, with a chemical formula of CuIn_{x}Ga_{(1−x)}Se_{2}, where the value of x can vary from 1 (pure copper indium selenide) to 0 (pure copper gallium selenide). It is a tetrahedrally bonded semiconductor, with the chalcopyrite crystal structure. The bandgap varies continuously with x from about 1.0 eV (for copper indium selenide) to about 1.7 eV (for copper gallium selenide).

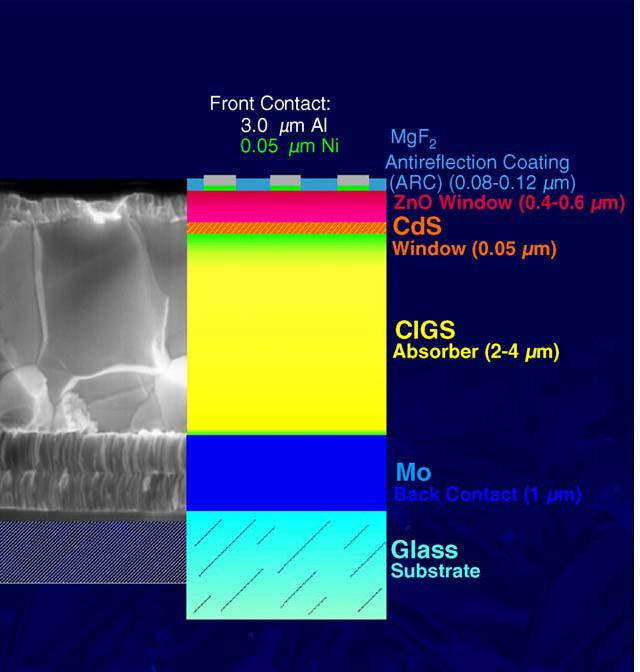
Figure 1: Structure of a CIGS device. CdS is used optionally and some CIGS cells contain no cadmium at all.

CIGS has an exceptionally high absorption coefficient of more than 10^{5}/cm for 1.5 eV and higher energy photons. CIGS solar cells with efficiencies around 20% have been claimed by the National Renewable Energy Laboratory (NREL), the Swiss Federal Laboratories for Materials Science and Technology (Empa), and the German Zentrum für Sonnenenergie und Wasserstoff Forschung (ZSW) (translated: Center for Solar Energy and Hydrogen Research), which is the record to date for any thin film solar cell. In 2024 a CIGS efficiency record of 23.64% was claimed.

All high performance CIGS absorbers in solar cells have similarities independent of production technique. First, they are polycrystalline α-phase which has the chalcopyrite crystal structure shown in Figure 3. The second property is an overall Cu deficiency. Cu deficiency increases the majority carrier (hole) concentration by increasing the number of (electron-accepting) Cu vacancies. When CIGS films are In rich (Cu deficient) the film's surface layer forms an ordered defect compound (ODC) with a stoichiometry of Cu(In,Ga)_{3}Se_{5}. The ODC is n-type, forming a p-n homojunction in the film at the interface between the α phase and the ODC. The recombination velocity at the CIGS/CdS interface is decreased by the homojunction's presence. The drop in interface recombination attributable to ODC formation is demonstrated by experiments which have shown that recombination in the bulk of the film is the main loss mechanism in Cu deficient films, while in Cu rich films the main loss is at the CIGS/CdS interface.

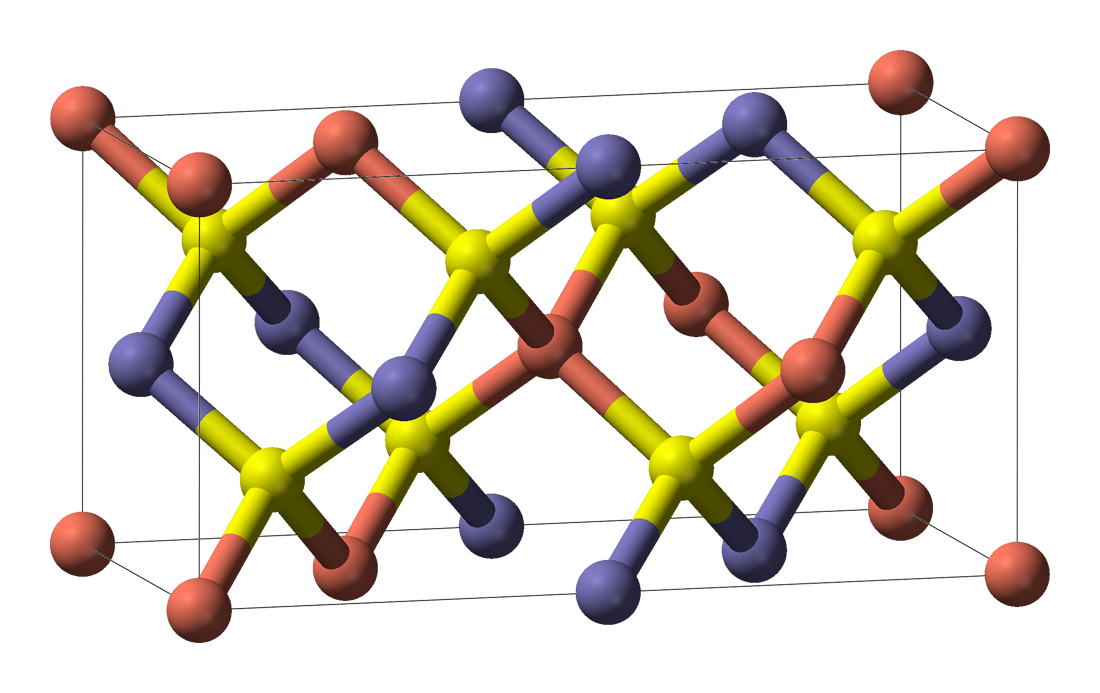
Figure 3: CIGS unit cell. Red = Cu, Yellow = Se, Blue = In/Ga

Sodium incorporation is necessary for optimal performance. Ideal Na concentration is considered to be approximately 0.1%. Na is commonly supplied by the soda-lime glass substrate, but in processes that do not use this substrate the Na must be deliberately added. Na's beneficial effects include increases in p-type conductivity, texture, and average grain size. Furthermore, Na incorporation allows for performance to be maintained over larger stoichiometric deviations. Simulations have predicted that Na on an In site creates a shallow acceptor level and that Na serves to remove In on Cu defects (donors), but reasons for these benefits are controversial. Na is also credited with catalyzing oxygen absorption. Oxygen passivates Se vacancies that act as compensating donors and recombination centers.

Alloying CIS (CuInSe_{2}) with CGS (CuGaSe_{2}) increases the bandgap. To reach the ideal bandgap for a single junction solar cell, 1.5 eV, a Ga/(In+Ga) ratio of roughly 0.7 is optimal. However, at ratios above ~0.3, device performance drops off. Industry currently targets the 0.3 Ga/(In+Ga) ratio, resulting in bandgaps between 1.1 and 1.2 eV. The decreasing performance has been postulated to be a result of CGS not forming the ODC, which is necessary for a good interface with CdS.

The highest efficiency devices show substantial texturing, or preferred crystallographic orientation. A (204) surface orientation is observed in the best quality devices. A smooth absorber surface is preferred to maximize the ratio of the illuminated area to the area of the interface. The area of the interface increases with roughness while illuminated area remains constant, decreasing open-circuit voltage (V_{OC}). Studies have also linked an increase in defect density to decreased V_{OC}. Recombination in CIGS has been suggested to be dominated by non-radiative processes. Theoretically, recombination can be controlled by engineering the film, and is extrinsic to the material.

== Structure ==
The most common device structure for CIGS solar cells is shown in the diagram (see Figure 1: Structure of a CIGS device). Soda-lime glass of about of 1–3 millimetres thickness is commonly used as a substrate, because the glass sheets contains sodium, which has been shown to yield a substantial open-circuit voltage increase, notably through surface and grain boundary defects passivation. However, many companies are also looking at lighter and more flexible substrates such as polyimide or metal foils. A molybdenum (Mo) metal layer is deposited (commonly by sputtering) which serves as the back contact and reflects most unabsorbed light back into the CIGS absorber. Following molybdenum deposition a p-type CIGS absorber layer is grown by one of several unique methods. A thin n-type buffer layer is added on top of the absorber. The buffer is typically cadmium sulfide (CdS) deposited via chemical bath deposition. The buffer is overlaid with a thin, intrinsic zinc oxide layer (i-ZnO) which is capped by a thicker, aluminium (Al) doped ZnO layer. The i-ZnO layer is used to protect the CdS and the absorber layer from sputtering damage while depositing the ZnO:Al window layer, since the latter is usually deposited by DC sputtering, known as a damaging process. The Al doped ZnO serves as a transparent conducting oxide to collect and move electrons out of the cell while absorbing as little light as possible.

The CuInSe_{2}-based materials that are of interest for photovoltaic applications include several elements from groups I, III and VI in the periodic table. These semiconductors are especially attractive for solar applications because of their high optical absorption coefficients and versatile optical and electrical characteristics, which can in principle be manipulated and tuned for a specific need in a given device.

=== Conversion efficiency ===
Solar cell efficiencies of various technologies as tracked by NREL, with CIGS progress in green

CIGS is mainly used in the form of polycrystalline thin films. The best efficiency achieved as of September 2014 was 21.7%. A team at the National Renewable Energy Laboratory achieved 19.9%, a record at the time, by modifying the CIGS surface and making it look like CIS. These examples were deposited on glass, which meant the products were not mechanically flexible. In 2013, scientists at the Swiss Federal Laboratories for Materials Science and Technology developed CIGS cells on flexible polymer foils with a new record efficiency of 20.4%. These display both the highest efficiency and greatest flexibility.

The U.S. National Renewable Energy Laboratory confirmed 13.8% module efficiency of a large-area (meter-square) production panel, and 13% total-area (and 14.2% aperture-area) efficiency with some production modules. In September 2012 the German Manz AG presented a CIGS solar module with an efficiency of 14.6% on total module surface and 15.9% on aperture, which was produced on a mass production facility. MiaSolé obtained a certified 15.7% aperture-area efficiency on a 1 m^{2} production module, and Solar Frontier claimed a 17.8% efficiency on a 900 cm^{2} module.

Higher efficiencies (around 30%) can be obtained by using optics to concentrate the incident light. The use of gallium increases the optical band gap of the CIGS layer as compared to pure CIS, thus increasing the open-circuit voltage. Gallium's relative abundance, compared to indium, lowers costs.

Lab record CIGS efficiencies by substrate, ~0.9 cm^{2}
Substrate	Glass	Steel	Aluminium	Polymer
Efficiency	23.6%	17.7%	16.2%	20.4%
Institute	Uppsala University/Evolar	Empa	Empa	Empa

=== Comparison ===
==== Conventional crystalline silicon ====
Unlike conventional crystalline silicon cells based on a homojunction, the structure of CIGS cells is a more complex heterojunction system. A direct bandgap material, CIGS has very strong light absorption and a layer of only 1–2 micrometers (μm) is enough to absorb most of the sunlight. By comparison, a much greater thickness of about 160–190 μm is required for crystalline silicon.

The active CIGS-layer can be deposited in a polycrystalline form directly onto molybdenum (Mo) coated on a variety of several different substrates such as glass sheets, steel bands and plastic foils made of polyimide. This uses less energy than smelting large amounts of quartz sand in electric furnaces and growing large crystals, necessary for conventional silicon cells, and thus reduces its energy payback time significantly. Also unlike crystalline silicon, these substrates can be flexible.

In the competitive PV industry, CIGS manufacturers faced increasing pressure, resulting in the bankruptcy of several companies as prices for conventional silicon cells declined. Despite this, CIGS solar cells have reached efficiencies comparable to multicrystalline silicon cells, the most common type. CIGS and CdTe-PV remain the only commercially successful thin-film technologies in the rapidly growing global PV market.

==== Other thin films ====
In photovoltaics "thinness" generally is in reference to so-called "first generation" high-efficiency silicon cells, which are manufactured from bulk wafers hundreds of micrometers thick. Thin films sacrifice some light gathering efficiency but use less material. In CIGS the efficiency tradeoff is less severe than in silicon. The record efficiencies for thin film CIGS cells are slightly lower than that of CIGS for lab-scale top performance cells. In 2008, CIGS efficiency was by far the highest compared with those achieved by other thin film technologies such as cadmium telluride photovoltaics (CdTe) or amorphous silicon (a-Si). CIS and CGS solar cells offer total area efficiencies of 15.0% and 9.5%, respectively. In 2015, the gap with the other thin film technologies has been closed, with record cell efficiencies in laboratories of 21.5% for CdTe (FirstSolar) and 21.7% for CIGS (ZSW). (See also NREL best research cell efficiency chart.)

== Production ==
=== Film production ===
The most common vacuum-based process is to co-evaporate or co-sputter copper, gallium, and indium onto a substrate at room temperature, then anneal the resulting film with a selenide vapor. An alternative process is to co-evaporate copper, gallium, indium and selenium onto a heated substrate.

A non-vacuum-based alternative process deposits nanoparticles of the precursor materials on the substrate and then sinters them in situ. Electroplating is another low cost alternative to apply the CIGS layer.

The following sections outline the various techniques for precursor deposition processing, including sputtering of metallic layers at low temperatures, printing of inks containing nanoparticles, electrodeposition, and a technique inspired by wafer-bonding.

==== Selenization ====
The Se supply and selenization environment is important in determining the properties and quality of the film. When Se is supplied in the gas phase (for example as H_{2}Se or elemental Se) at high temperatures, the Se becomes incorporated into the film by absorption and subsequent diffusion. During this step, called chalcogenization, complex interactions occur to form a chalcogenide. These interactions include formation of Cu-In-Ga intermetallic alloys, formation of intermediate metal-selenide binary compounds and phase separation of various stoichiometric CIGS compounds. Because of the variety and complexity of the reactions, the properties of the CIGS film are difficult to control.

The Se source affects the resulting film properties. H_{2}Se offers the fastest Se incorporation into the absorber; 50 at% Se can be achieved in CIGS films at temperatures as low as 400 °C. By comparison, elemental Se only achieves full incorporation with reaction temperatures above 500 °C. Films formed at lower temperatures from elemental Se were Se deficient, but had multiple phases including metal selenides and various alloys. Use of H_{2}Se provides the best compositional uniformity and the largest grain sizes. However, H_{2}Se is highly toxic and is classified as an environmental hazard.

==== Sputtering of metallic layers followed by selenization ====
In this method a metal film of Cu, In and Ga is sputtered at or near room temperature and reacted in a Se atmosphere at high temperature. This process has higher throughput than coevaporation and compositional uniformity can be more easily achieved.

Sputtering a stacked multilayer of metal – for example a Cu/In/Ga/Cu/In/Ga... structure – produces a smoother surface and better crystallinity in the absorber compared to a simple bilayer (Cu-Ga alloy/In) or trilayer (Cu/In/Ga) sputtering. These attributes result in higher efficiency devices, but forming the multilayer is a more complicated deposition process and did not merit the extra equipment or the added process complexity. Additionally, the reaction rates of Cu/Ga and Cu/In layers with Se are different. If the reaction temperature is not high enough, or not held long enough, CIS and CGS form as separate phases.

Companies currently that used similar processes include Showa Shell, Avancis, Miasolé, Honda Soltec, and Energy Photovoltaics (EPV). Showa Shell sputtered a Cu-Ga alloy layer and an In layer, followed by selenization in H_{2}Se and sulfurization in H_{2}S. The sulfurization step appears to passivate the surface in a way similar to CdS in most other cells. Thus, the buffer layer used is Cd-free, eliminating any environmental impact of Cd. Showa Shell reported a maximum module efficiency of 13.6% with an average of 11.3% for 3600 cm^{2} substrates. Shell Solar uses the same technique as Showa Shell to create the absorber; however, their CdS layer comes from chemical vapor deposition. Modules sold by Shell Solar claim 9.4% module efficiency.

Miasole had procured venture capital funds for its process and scale up. A record 17.4% aperture efficiency module was confirmed by Fraunhofer in 2019.

EPV uses a hybrid between coevaporation and sputtering in which In and Ga are evaporated in a Se atmosphere. This is followed by Cu sputtering and selenization. Finally, In and Ga are again evaporated in the presence of Se. Based on Hall measurements, these films have a low carrier concentration and relatively high mobility. EPV films have a low defect concentration.

==== Chalcogenization of particulate precursor layers ====
In this method, metal or metal-oxide nanoparticles are used as the precursors for CIGS growth. These nanoparticles are generally suspended in a water based solution and then applied to large areas by various methods, such as printing. The film is then dehydrated and, if the precursors are metal-oxides, reduced in a H_{2}/N_{2} atmosphere. Following dehydration, the remaining porous film is sintered and selenized at temperatures greater than 400 °C.

Nanosolar and International Solar Electric Technology (ISET) unsuccessfully attempted to scale up this process. ISET uses oxide particles, while Nanosolar did not discuss its ink. The advantages of this process include uniformity over large areas, non-vacuum or low-vacuum equipment and adaptability to roll-to-roll manufacturing. When compared to laminar metal precursor layers, sintered nanoparticles selenize more rapidly. The increased rate is a result of the greater surface area associated with porosity. Porosity produces rougher absorber surfaces. Use of particulate precursors allows for printing on a large variety of substrates with materials utilization of 90% or more. Little research and development supported this technique.

Nanosolar reported a cell (not module) efficiency of 14%, however this was not verified by any national laboratory testing, nor did they allow onsite inspections. In independent testing ISET's absorber had the 2nd lowest efficiency at 8.6%. However, all the modules that beat ISET's module were coevaporated, a process which has manufacturing disadvantages and higher costs. ISET's sample suffered most from low V_{OC} and low fill factor, indicative of a rough surface and/or a high number of defects aiding recombination. Related to these issues, the film had poor transport properties including a low Hall mobility and short carrier lifetime.

==== Electrodeposition followed by selenization ====
Precursors can be deposited by electrodeposition. Two methodologies exist: deposition of elemental layered structures and simultaneous deposition of all elements (including Se). Both methods require thermal treatment in a Se atmosphere to make device quality films. Because electrodeposition requires conductive electrodes, metal foils are a logical substrate. Electrodeposition of elemental layers is similar to the sputtering of elemental layers.

Simultaneous deposition employs a working electrode (cathode), a counter electrode (anode), and a reference electrode as in Figure 4. A metal foil substrate is used as the working electrode in industrial processes. An inert material provides the counter electrode, and the reference electrode measures and controls the potential. The reference electrode allows the process to be performed potentiostatically, allowing control of the substrate's potential.

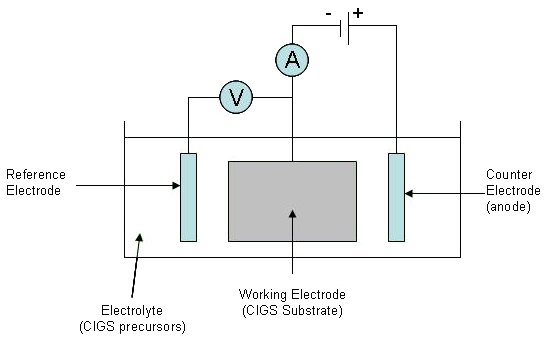
Figure 4: CIGS electrodeposition apparatus

Simultaneous electrodeposition must overcome the fact that the elements' standard reduction potentials are not equal, causing preferential deposition of a single element. This problem is commonly alleviated by adding countering ions into solution for each ion to be deposited (Cu^{2+}, Se^{4+}, In^{3+}, and Ga^{3+}), thus changing that ion's reduction potential. Further, the Cu-Se system has a complicated behavior and the film's composition depends on the Se^{4+}/Cu^{2+} ion flux ratio which can vary over the film surface. This requires the precursor concentrations and deposition potential to be optimized. Even with optimization, reproducibility is low over large areas due to composition variations and potential drops along the substrate.

The resulting films have small grains, are Cu-rich, and generally contain Cu_{2−x}Se_{x} phases along with impurities from the solution. Annealing is required to improve crystallinity. For efficiencies higher than 7%, a stoichiometry correction are required. The correction was originally done via high temperature physical vapor deposition, which is not practical in industry.

Solopower is currently producing cells with >13.7% conversion efficiency as per NREL.

==== Precursor combination by wafer-bonding inspired technique ====
Figure 5: Schematic of wafer-bonding inspired technique

In this process, two different precursor films are deposited separately on a substrate and a superstrate. The films are pressed together and heated to release the film from the reusable superstrate, leaving a CIGS absorber on the substrate (Figure 5). Heliovolt patented this procedure and named it the FASST process. In principle, the precursors can be deposited at low temperature using low-cost deposition techniques, lowering module cost. However, the first generations of products use higher temperature PVD methods and do not achieve full cost cutting potential. Flexible substrates could eventually be used in this process.

Typical film characteristics are not known outside of the company, as no research has been conducted by independently funded laboratories. However, Heliovolt claimed a top cell efficiency of 12.2%.

=== Coevaporation ===
Coevaporation, or codeposition, is the most prevalent CIGS fabrication technique. Boeing's coevaporation process deposits bilayers of CIGS with different stoichiometries onto a heated substrate and allows them to intermix.

NREL developed another process that involves three deposition steps and produced the current CIGS efficiency record holder at 20.3%. The first step in NREL's method is codeposition of In, Ga, and Se. This is followed by Cu and Se deposited at a higher temperature to allow for diffusion and intermixing of the elements. In the final stage In, Ga, and Se are again deposited to make the overall composition Cu deficient.

Würth Solar began producing CIGS cells using an inline coevaporation system in 2005 with module efficiencies between 11% and 12%. They opened another production facility and continued to improve efficiency and yield. Other companies scaling up coevaporation processes include Global Solar and Ascent Solar. Global Solar used an inline three stage deposition process. In all of the steps Se is supplied in excess in the vapor phase. In and Ga are first evaporated followed by Cu and then by In and Ga to make the film Cu deficient. These films performed quite favorably in relation to other manufacturers and to absorbers grown at NREL and the Institute for Energy Conversion (IEC). However, modules of Global Solar's films did not perform as well. The property in which the module most obviously under-performed was a low V_{OC}, which is characteristic of high defect density and high recombination velocities. Global Solar's absorber layer outperformed the NREL absorber in carrier lifetime and hall mobility. However, as completed cells the NREL sample performed better. This is evidence of a poor CIGS/CdS interface, possibly due to the lack of an ODC surface layer on the Global Solar film.

Disadvantages include uniformity issues over large areas and the related difficulty of coevaporating elements in an inline system. Also, high growth temperatures raise the thermal budget and costs. Additionally, coevaporation is plagued by low material utilization (deposition on chamber walls instead of the substrate, especially for selenium) and expensive vacuum equipment. A way to enhance Se utilisation is via a thermal or plasma-enhanced selenium-cracking process, which can be coupled with an ion beam source for ion beam assisted deposition.

=== Chemical vapor deposition ===
Chemical vapor deposition (CVD) has been implemented in multiple ways for the deposition of CIGS. Processes include atmosphere pressure metal organic CVD (AP-MOCVD), plasma-enhanced CVD (PECVD), low-pressure MOCVD (LP-MOCVD), and aerosol assisted MOCVD (AA-MOCVD). Research is attempting to switch from dual-source precursors to single-source precursors. Multiple source precursors must be homogeneously mixed and the flow rates of the precursors have to be kept at the proper stoichiometry. Single-source precursor methods do not suffer from these drawbacks and should enable better control of film composition.

As of 2014 CVD was not used for commercial CIGS synthesis. CVD produced films have low efficiency and a low V_{OC}, partially a result of a high defect concentration. Additionally, film surfaces are generally quite rough which serves to further decrease the V_{OC}. However, the requisite Cu deficiency has been achieved using AA-MOCVD along with a (112) crystal orientation.

CVD deposition temperatures are lower than those used for other processes such as co-evaporation and selenization of metallic precursors. Therefore, CVD has a lower thermal budget and lower costs. Potential manufacturing problems include difficulties converting CVD to an inline process as well as the expense of handling volatile precursors.

=== Electrospray deposition ===
CIS films can be produced by electrospray deposition. The technique involves the electric field assisted spraying of ink containing CIS nano-particles onto the substrate directly and then sintering in an inert environment. The main advantage of this technique is that the process takes place at room temperature and it is possible to attach this process with some continuous or mass production system like roll-to-roll production mechanism.

== Rear surface passivation ==
Concepts of the rear surface passivation for CIGS solar cells shows the potential to improve the efficiency. The rear passivation concept has been taken from passivation technology of Silicon solar cells. Al_{2}O_{3} and SiO_{2} have been used as the passivation materials. Nano-sized point contacts on Al_{2}O_{3} layer and line contacts on SiO2 layer provide the electrical connection of CIGS absorber to the rear electrode Molybdenum. The point contacts on the Al_{2}O_{3} layer are created by e-beam lithography and the line contacts on the SiO2 layer are created using photolithography. It is also seen that the implementation of the passivation layers does not change the morphology of the CIGS layers

== Radiation tolerance ==
CIGS solar cells exhibit high radiation tolerance, making them promising candidates for space applications. Studies show that electron irradiation causes only minimal impact to the performance of the solar cells. On the other side, high doses of proton irradiation degrade the optical and electrical properties of the CIGS solar cells, primarily by inducing defects that reduce the power-conversion-efficiency and increase recombination losses. However, CIGS solar cells demonstrate a remarkable ability to recover from irradiation damage through thermal annealing. This process enables defect healing, restoring the optical properties and photovoltaic performance to near pre-irradiation levels. The self-healing effect is attributed to the material's flexible defect chemistry, allowing displaced atoms to revert to their original sites at moderate temperatures, which are compatible with the in-orbit space environment.

== See also ==
- List of CIGS companies
- CZTS
