= Copper indium gallium selenide =

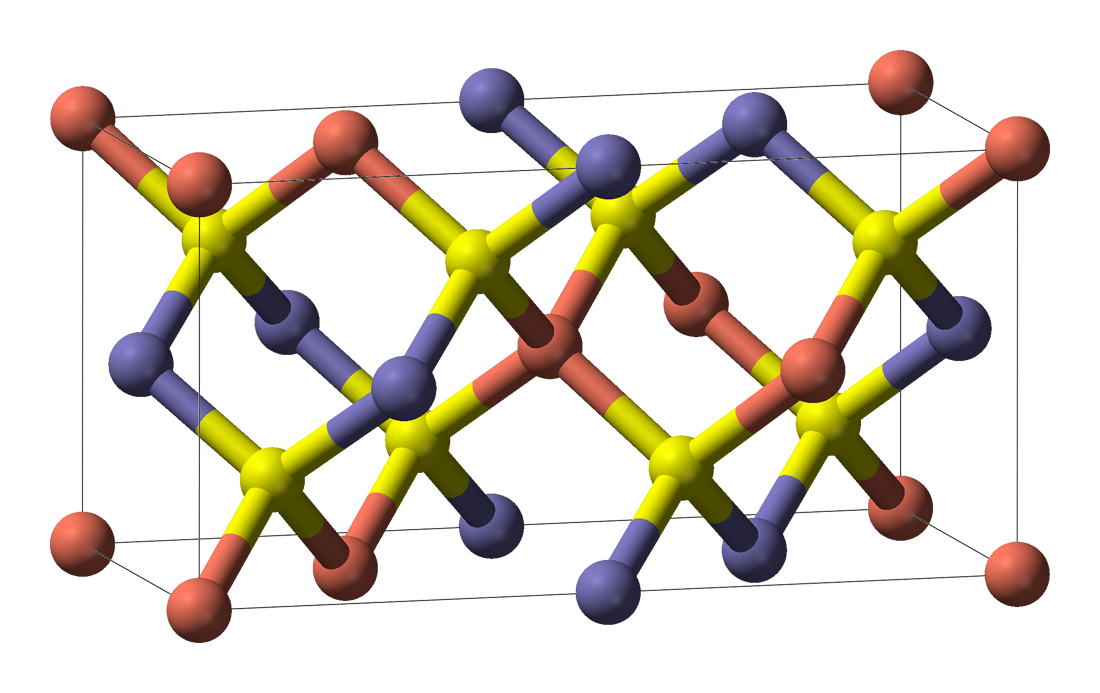
- CIGS unit cell. Red = Cu, yellow = Se, blue = In/Ga

Identifiers
CAS Number	12018-95-0(CuInSe_{2})
3D model (JSmol)	Ga:In = 1:1: Interactive image
- InChI: Ga:In = 1:1: InChI=1S/2Cu.Ga.In.4Se/q2*+1;2*+3;4*-2 Key: HEKINFXMJXBFGJ-UHFFFAOYSA-N
- SMILES: Ga:In = 1:1: [Cu+1].[Cu+1].[Ga+3].[In+3].[Se-2].[Se-2].[Se-2].[Se-2]

Properties
Chemical formula	CuIn_{1−x}Ga_{x}Se_{2}
Density	~5.7 g/cm^{3}
Melting point	1,070 to 990 °C (1,960 to 1,810 °F; 1,340 to 1,260 K) (x = 0–1)
Band gap	1.0–1.7 eV (x = 0–1)

Structure
Crystal structure	tetragonal, Pearson symbol tI16
Space group	I4̅2d
Lattice constant	a = 0.56–0.58 nm (x = 0–1), c = 1.10–1.15 nm (x = 0–1)
- Except where otherwise noted, data are given for materials in their standard state (at 25 °C [77 °F], 100 kPa). Infobox references

Copper indium gallium (di)selenide (CIGS) is a I-III-VI_{2} semiconductor material composed of copper, indium, gallium, and selenium. The material is a solid solution of copper indium selenide (often abbreviated "CIS") and copper gallium selenide. It has a chemical formula of CuIn_{1−x}Ga_{x}Se_{2}, where the value of x can vary from 0 (pure copper indium selenide) to 1 (pure copper gallium selenide). CIGS is a tetrahedrally bonded semiconductor, with the chalcopyrite crystal structure, and a bandgap varying continuously with x from about 1.0 eV (for copper indium selenide) to about 1.7 eV (for copper gallium selenide).

== Structure ==
CIGS is a tetrahedrally bonded semiconductor, with the chalcopyrite crystal structure. Upon heating it transforms to the zincblende form and the transition temperature decreases from 1045 °C for x = 0 to 805 °C for x = 1.

== Applications ==
It is best known as the material for CIGS solar cells a thin-film technology used in the photovoltaic industry. In this role, CIGS has the advantage of being able to be deposited on flexible substrate materials, producing highly flexible, lightweight solar panels. Improvements in efficiency have made CIGS an established technology among alternative cell materials.

== See also ==
- CZTS
- List of CIGS companies
