= Heterojunction solar cell =

Solar-cell architecture

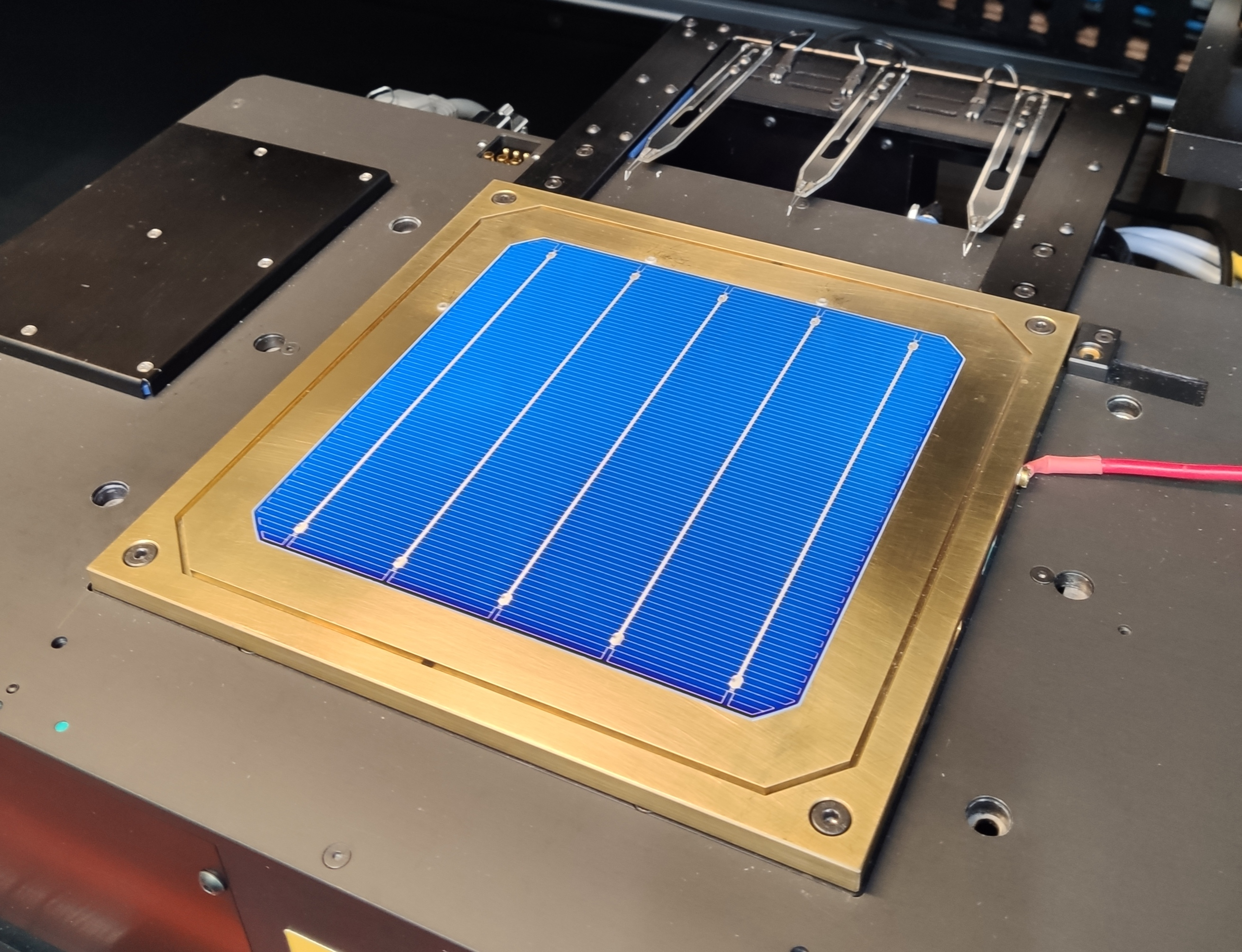
A silicon heterojunction solar cell that has been metallised with screen-printed silver paste undergoing Current–voltage curve characterisation

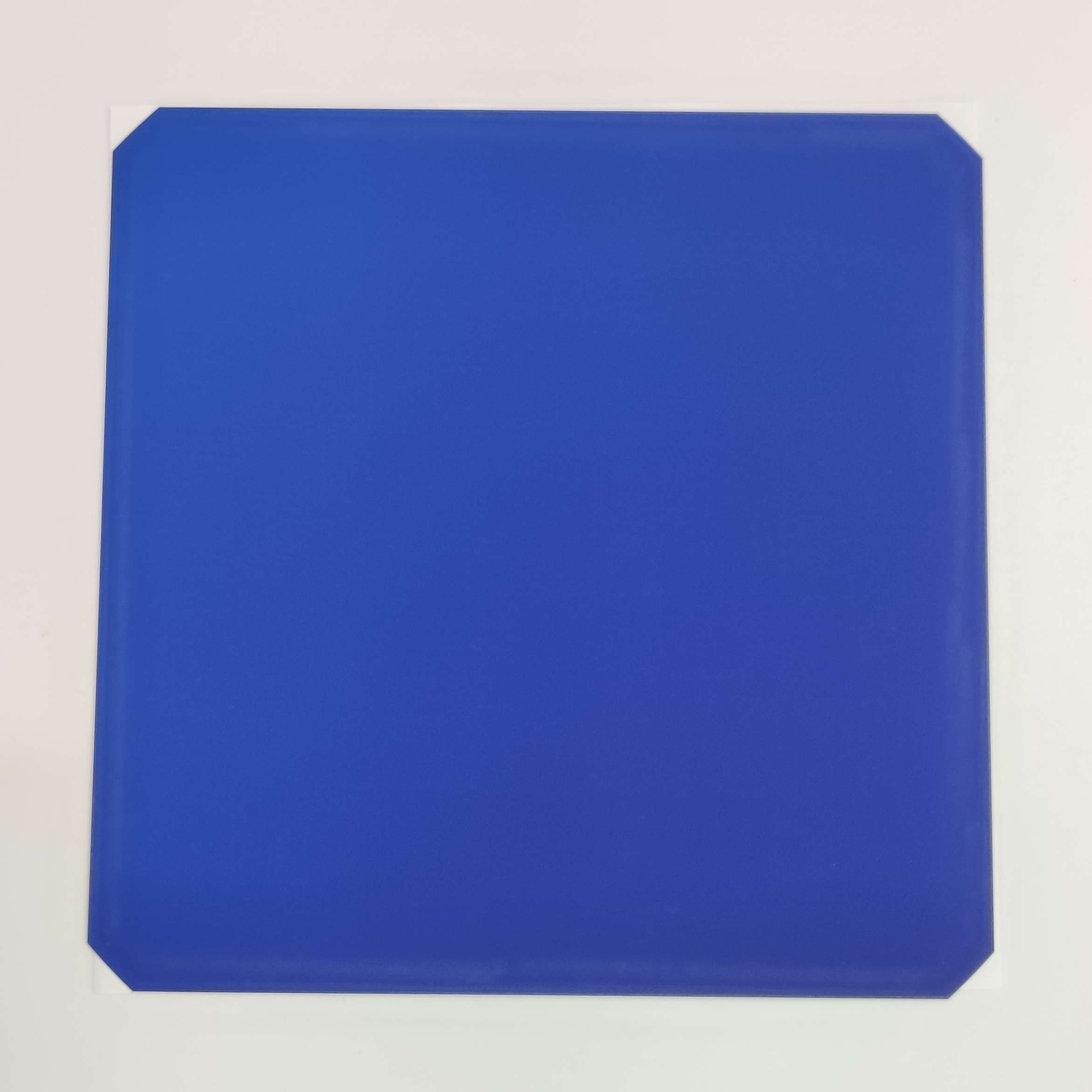
An unmetallised heterojunction solar cell precursor. The blue colour arises from the dual-purpose Indium tin oxide anti-reflective coating, which also enhances emitter conduction.

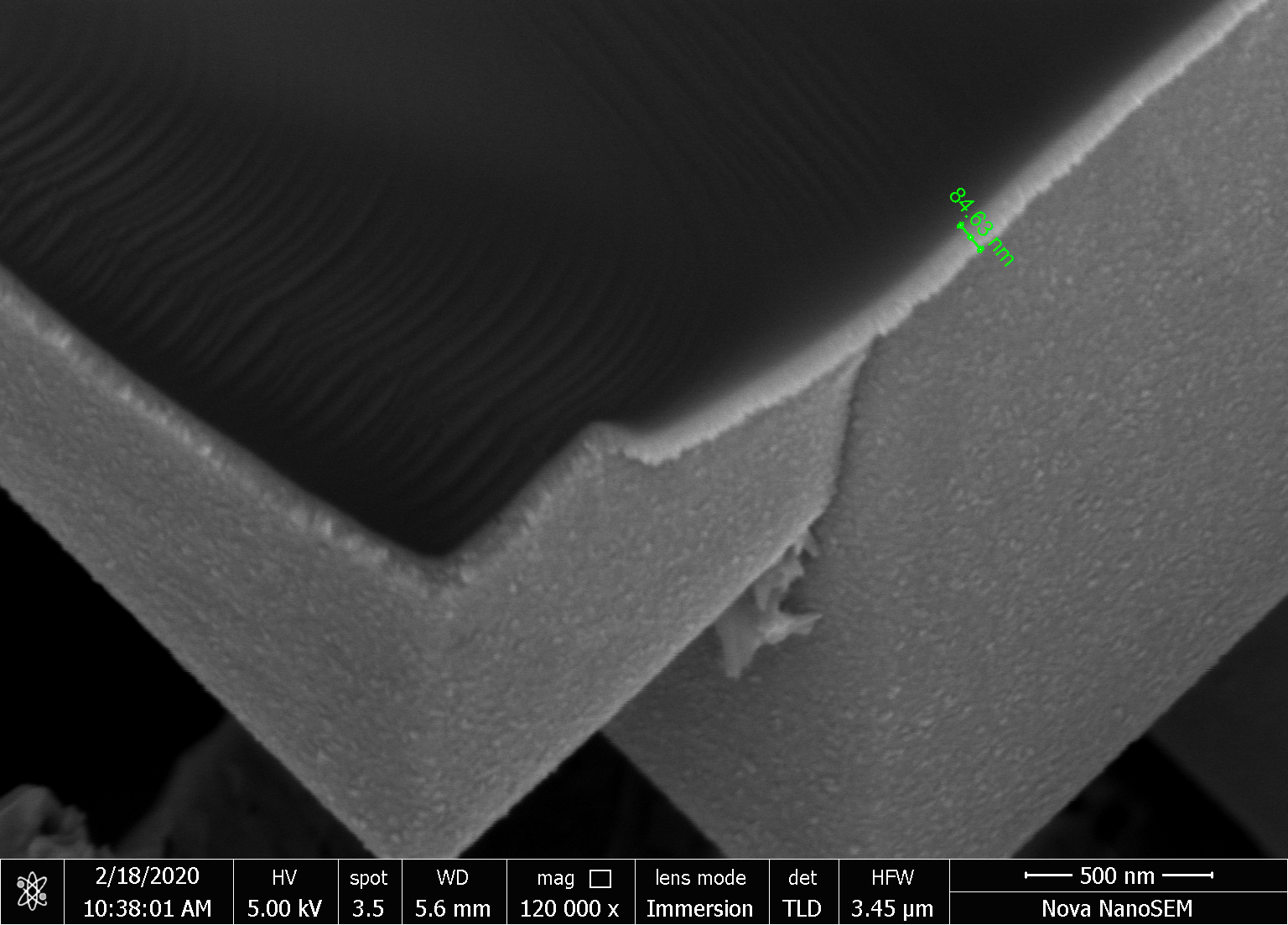
A SEM image depicting the pyramids and antireflection coating of a heterojunction solar cell

Heterojunction solar cells (HJT), variously known as Silicon heterojunctions (SHJ) or Heterojunction with Intrinsic Thin Layer (HIT), are a family of photovoltaic cell technologies based on a heterojunction formed between semiconductors with dissimilar band gaps. They are a hybrid technology, combining aspects of conventional crystalline solar cells with thin-film solar cells.

Silicon heterojunction-based solar panels are commercially mass-produced in high volumes for residential and utility markets. As of 2023, Silicon heterojunction architecture has the highest cell efficiency for mass-produced silicon solar cells. In 2022–2024, SHJ cells overtook Aluminium back surface field (Al-BSF) solar cells in market share to become the third-most adopted commercial solar cell technology after conventional crystalline PERC (Passivated Emitter Rear Cell) and TOPCon (Tunnel Oxide Passivated Contact), with a projected increase to up to 10% market share by 2032. It is not expected to outgrow these technologies due to having a similar theoretical efficiency ceiling to TOPCon but higher production costs.

Solar cells operate when light excites the absorber substrate. This creates electron–hole pairs that must be separated into electrons (negative charge carriers) and holes (positive charge carriers) by asymmetry in the solar cell, provided through chemical gradients or electric fields in semiconducting junctions. After splitting, the carriers travel to opposing terminals of the solar cell that have carrier-discriminating properties (known as selective contacts). For solar cells to operate efficiently with a low probability of mutual annihilation of the carriers (recombination), absorber substrates and contact interfaces require protection from passivation to prevent electrons and holes from being trapped at surface defects.

SHJ cells generally consist of an active crystalline silicon absorber substrate which is passivated by a thin layer of hydrogenated intrinsic amorphous silicon (denoted as a-Si:H; the "buffer layer"), and overlayers of appropriately doped amorphous or nanocrystalline silicon selective contacts. The selective contact material and the absorber have different band gaps, forming the carrier-separating heterojunctions that are analogous to the p-n junction of traditional solar cells. The high efficiency of heterojunction solar cells is owed mostly to the excellent passivation qualities of the buffer layers, particularly with respect to separating the highly recombination-active metallic contacts from the absorber. Due to their symmetrical structure, SHJ modules commonly have a bifaciality factor over 90%.

As the thin layers are usually temperature sensitive, heterojunction cells are constrained to a low-temperature manufacturing process. This presents challenges for electrode metallisation, as the typical silver paste screen printing metallisation method requires firing at up to 800 °C; well above the upper tolerance for most "buffer layer" materials. As a result, the electrodes are commonly composed of a low curing temperature silver paste, or uncommonly a silver-coated copper paste or electroplated copper.

== History ==
The heterojunction structure, and the ability of amorphous silicon layers to effectively passivate crystalline silicon has been well documented since the 1970s. Heterojunction solar cells using amorphous and crystalline silicon were developed with a conversion efficiency of more than 12% in 1983. Sanyo Electric Co. (now a subsidiary of Panasonic Group) filed several patents pertaining to heterojunction devices including a-Si and μc-Si intrinsic layers in the early 1990s, trademarked "heterojunction with intrinsic thin-layer" (HIT). The inclusion of the intrinsic layer significantly increased efficiency over doped a-Si heterojunction solar cells through reduced density of trapping states, and reduced dark tunnelling leakage currents.

Research and development of SHJ solar cells was suppressed until the expiry of Sanyo-issued patents in 2011, allowing various companies to develop SHJ technology for commercialisation. In 2014, HIT cells with conversion efficiencies exceeding 25% were developed by Panasonic, which was then the highest for non-concentrated crystalline silicon cells. This record was broken more recently in 2018 by Kaneka corporation, which produced 26.7% efficient large area interdigitated back contact (IBC) SHJ solar cells, and again in 2022 and 2023 by LONGi with 26.81% and 27.09% efficiency respectively. In 2023, SHJ combined with Perovskite in monolithic tandem cells also recorded the highest non-concentrated Two-junction cell efficiency at 33.9%.

In 2023, heterojunction solar panels have been fabricated with efficiencies up to 23.89%.

SHJ solar cells are now mass-produced on the gigawatt scale. In 2022, projects planned for the establishment or expansion of SHJ production lines totaled approximately 350 GW/year of additional capacity. Over 24 (mostly Chinese) manufacturers are beginning or augmenting their heterojunction production capacity, such as Huasun, Risen, Jingang (Golden Glass), LONGi, Meyer Burger and many more.

=== Utility scale projects ===
In early 2022, a 150 MW heterojunction solar farm was completed by Bulgarian EPC company Inercom near the village of Apriltsi in Pazardzhik Province, Bulgaria—the largest HJT solar farm at the time, according to a press release by module supplier Huasun. In 2023, the same supplier announced a further 1.5 GW supply deal of HJT modules to Inercom.

== Advantages ==
=== Performance ===
==== Efficiency and voltage ====
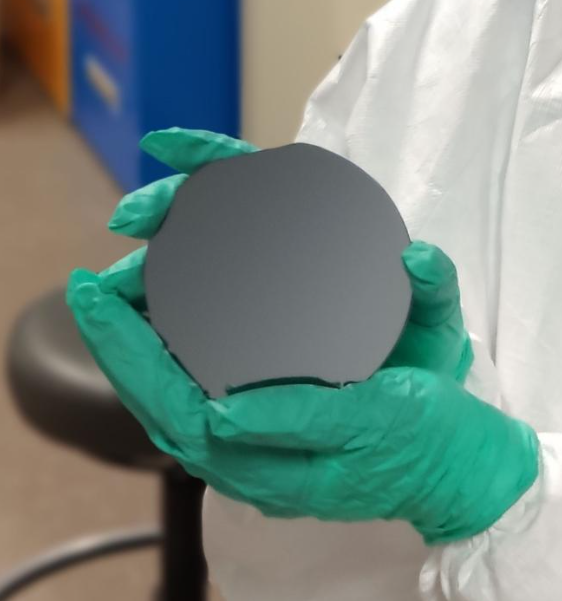
A monocrystalline silicon wafer coated with a thin film of amorphous silicon (not visible). Such an amorphous silicon layer is responsible for the high efficiency of heterojunction solar cells through surface passivation.

SHJ has the highest efficiency amongst crystalline silicon solar cells in both laboratory (world record efficiency) and commercial production (average efficiency). In 2023, the average efficiency for commercial SHJ cells was 25.0%, compared with 24.9% for n-type TOPCon and 23.3% for p-type PERC. The high efficiency is owed mostly to very high open-circuit voltages—consistently over 700 mV—as a result of excellent surface passivation. Since 2023, SHJ bottom cells in Perovskite tandems also hold the highest non-concentrated Two-junction cell efficiency at 33.9%. Due to their superior surface passivation, heterojunction cells generally have a lower diode saturation current density than other silicon solar cells (such as TOPCon), allowing for very high fill factor and voltage; and hence record high efficiency.

==== Bifaciality ====
Bifaciality refers to the ability of a solar cell to accept light from the front or rear surface. The collection of light from the rear surface can significantly improve energy yields in deployed solar arrays. SHJ cells can be manufactured with a conductive ARC on both sides, allowing a bifaciality factor above 90%, compared to ~70% for PERC cells with rear grid. Bifacial solar modules are expected to significantly increase their market share over monofacial modules to 85% by 2032.

==== Lifespan ====
By virtue of their high bifaciality, silicon heterojunction modules can exploit more advantages of glass–glass module designs compared to other cell technologies. Glass–glass modules using EPE encapsulant are particularly effective in preventing water ingress, which is a significant cause of performance degradation in PV modules. When used with the appropriate module encapsulant, a glass–glass SHJ module is generally expected to have an operational lifespan of over 30 years; significantly longer than a glass–polymer foil backsheet (the module technology with the highest market share as of 2023). Glass–glass modules are heavier than glass–polymer foil backsheet modules, however due to improvement in tempered glass technology resistance to impact damage and module designs, the glass thickness (and hence weight) is expected to reduce, with the mainstream tending from 3.2 mm towards 2 mm or less in the 2030s. As a result, glass–glass modules are expected to become the dominant PV technology in the mid 2020s according to ITRPV (2023).

For example, utility scale 680 W heterojunction modules with a 30-year performance derating of 93% were announced by Enel in 2022.

==== Temperature coefficient ====
The temperature coefficient refers to how the output power of a solar module changes with temperature. Typically, solar modules see a reduction in output power and efficiency at elevated temperatures. From lab testing and supplier datasheet surveys, modules fabricated with SHJ cells consistently measure an equal or lower temperature coefficient (i.e. the decrease in efficiency is less severe) compared with Al-BSF, PERC, PERT and hybrid PERT/rear-heterojunction solar cells. This applies to a range of parameters, including open-circuit voltage, maximum power point power, short circuit current and fill factor. The temperature sensitivity of solar cells has been inversely correlated to high open-circuit voltages compared to the absorber band gap potential, as noted by Martin Green in 1982; "As the open-circuit voltage of silicon solar cells continues to improve, one resulting advantage, not widely appreciated, is reduced temperature sensitivity of device performance". Thus the low temperature sensitivity of SHJ cells has been attributed to high $V_{OC}$ (700mV) from well passivated contacts.

=== Manufacturing ===
==== Energy consumption ====
SHJ production lines fundamentally do not use high temperature equipment such as diffusion or metal paste curing furnaces, and on average have a lower power consumption per watt of fabricated cells. According to China PV Industry Development Roadmap, in 2022, the average electricity consumption of n-type Heterojunction cell lines was 47,000 kWh/MW, whereas p-type PERC production lines consumed about 53,000 kWh/MW and for n-type TOPCon, about 56,000 kWh/MW. It is estimated that by 2030, the power consumption of n-type Heterojunction, p-type PERC and n-type TOPCon cell production lines will drop to 34,000 kWh/MW, 35,000 kWh/MW and 42,000 kWh/MW respectively. A 2014 study estimated the energy payback time of a SHJ module to be 1.5 years, compared to 1.8 years for a regular monocrystalline module; this figure was estimated to drop to 0.94 years vs. 1.2 years respectively for a prospective module in 2020 assuming 25% efficiency. Similarly, the life-cycle CO2-equivalent emissions per kWh for 2020 SHJ modules is estimated to be 20 grams vs 25 grams for a regular monocrystalline module.

==== Silicon consumption ====
Crystalline silicon wafers used in solar cells typically have a thickness between 130 and 180 μm. The mass of consumed silicon wafer comprises a significant proportion of the cost of the solar module, and as such reducing the wafer thickness has potential to achieve significant cost reduction. Fewer photons are absorbed in thinner silicon. However, as long as surface recombination is effectively suppressed, thinner wafers can maintain—or even increase open-circuit voltages. That is, the increase in open-circuit voltage may compensate for losses in short-circuit current due to thinner wafer usage. Thinner wafers fundamentally increase open-circuit voltage, as a greater proportion of recombination occurs in the bulk of the substrate if surfaces are well passivated, therefore reducing the thickness reduces the quantity of bulk defects. As SHJ cells have excellent surface passivation, reduction in their wafer thickness is more feasible than with other crystalline silicon solar cell technologies. As such, high efficiencies have been reported over a large range of wafer thicknesses, with the minimum on the order of 50 μm. On commercial-grade n-type substrates, the optimum thickness is estimated to be 40–60 μm. This advantage is not seen in technologies with non-passivated contacts or poor surface recombination such as PERC, in which the optimum thickness is greater than 100 μm.

== Disadvantages ==
=== Cost ===
==== Operational expenditure ====
SHJ modules are estimated to be approximately 3-4 ¢/Wp more expensive than PERC modules (both assuming Chinese manufacturing; sources cite 2018 benchmark). The majority of the increased operational expenditure is due to differences in metallisation technology, which was estimated to be responsible for about 1.8 ¢/Wp of that difference. The cost of PECVD for a-Si and sputtering for TCO layers were also significant contributors to cost increases. Other factors include higher cost of n-type wafers, as well as surface preparation.

==== Capital expenditure ====
Lower tool prices reduce CapEx cost per gigawatt. In 2020, the CapEx cost for SHJ was much higher than PERC. The major cost (up to 50%) of establishing a SHJ production line is attributed to the PECVD equipment. However, SHJ production line CapEx has been trending downward mostly due to the reduction in PECVD tool price, from $USD 125M before 2018 to $USD30–40 M at the end of 2020. As of 2021, the CapEx of SHJ production lines in Europe was still significantly greater than in China.

Higher tool throughput also reduces CapEx cost per gigawatt. In 2019, leading PECVD equipment throughput was below 3000 wafers/hour (manufactured by Meyer Burger, INDEOtec and Archers Suzhou Systems), with newer PECVD tools (such as those manufactured by Maxwell and GS Solar) increasing throughput to 5000–8000 wafers/hour.

=== Manufacturing ===
==== Reliance on n-type silicon ====
Although high efficiency SHJ cells can be manufactured using a p-type silicon substrate, the low temperature constraint on SHJ production makes the process of gettering (management of transition metal contamination defects) in p-type silicon substrate impossible and bulk hydrogenation cannot reliably passivate excessive defects. For the same concentration of transition metal contaminant defects, n-type wafers have a higher minority carrier lifetime due to the smaller capture cross section of holes (the minority charge carrier) compared to electrons. Similarly, the capture cross section ratio of electrons to holes is large for surface states (eg. silicon dangling bonds) and therefore well passivated surfaces are easier to achieve on n-type wafers. For these reasons, n-type wafers are strongly preferred for manufacturing, as time-consuming steps for improving bulk lifetimes are cut out and the risk of developing light-induced degradation is reduced. However, the cost of n-type wafers is usually cited to be about 8–10% higher than p-type.

The higher price of n-type wafers is attributed to

1. a smaller segregation coefficient of phosphorus in silicon whilst growing of doped monocrystalline ingots; resulting in a problematic variation in resistivity across the length of the ingot, and thus only about 75% of the volume meets the resistivity tolerance as required by PV manufacturers.
2. Increased consumables costs. Crucibles can only be used a small number of times as n-type ingots grown in crucibles that have been reused many times (rechargeable Czochralski; RCz) are less likely to be acceptable.

==== Surface preparation and texturing ====
One of the first steps in manufacturing crystalline silicon solar cells includes texturing and cleaning the surface of the silicon wafer substrate. For monocrystalline wafers, this involves an anisotropic wet chemical etch using a mixture of an alkaline solution (usually potassium hydroxide or metal ion-free tetramethylammonium hydroxide) and an organic additive to increase etching anisotropy (traditionally isopropyl alcohol, but now proprietary additives are used). The etch forms the light-trapping pyramidal texture that improves the output current of the finished solar cell. Due to stringent requirements for surface cleanliness for SHJ compared to PERC, the texturing and cleaning process is relatively more complex and consumes more chemicals. Some of these surface treatment steps include RCA cleaning, sulfuric acid/peroxide mixtures to remove organics, removal of metal ions using hydrochloric acid, and nitric acid oxidative cleaning and etch-backs. Recent developments in research has found that oxidative cleaning with ozonated water may help improve process efficiency and reduce waste, with the possibility of completely replacing RCA cleaning whilst maintaining the same surface quality.

==== Silver paste screen printing ====
The vast majority of solar cells are manufactured with screen-printed paste electrodes. SHJ cells are constrained to a low-temperature process and thus cannot use traditional furnace-fired silver paste for their electrodes, such as what is used in PERC, TOPCon and Al-BSF cells. The low-temperature paste composition compromises several factors in the performance and economics of SHJ, such as high silver consumption and lower grid conductivity. Furthermore, the screen printing process of low-temperature silver paste onto SHJ cells also generally has a significantly lower throughput compared to PERC screen printing lines, as manufacturers often use a lower printing and flooding velocity to achieve a high quality grid. Terawatt-scale solar is anticipated to consume a significant fraction of global silver demand unless alternatives are developed. Emerging technologies that may reduce silver consumption for SHJ include silver-coated copper paste, silver nanoparticle ink, and electroplated copper.

==== Technological maturity ====
SHJ production lines consist mostly of new equipment. Therefore until SHJ production lines have been amortized, SHJ experiences difficulties matching the cost-per-watt of TOPCon production, as existing PERC production lines can be retrofitted for TOPCon relatively easily. A report by Wood Mackenzie (Dec 2022) predicts that TOPCon will be favoured over SHJ for new module production in the United States in light of the Inflation Reduction Act for this reason, citing a preferable balance between high efficiency and capital expenditure.

== Structure ==
A cross-sectional schematic of the layers of a bifacial silicon heterojunction solar cell

An energy band diagram showing energy levels of layers in a typical SHJ solar cell

A "front-junction" heterojunction solar cell is composed of a p–i–n–i–n-doped stack of silicon layers; the middle being an n-type crystalline silicon wafer and the others being amorphous thin layers. Then, overlayers of a transparent conducting oxide (TCO) antireflection coating and metal grid are used for light and current collection. Due to the high bifaciality of the SHJ structure, the similar n–i–n–i–p "rear-junction" configuration is also used by manufacturers and may have advantages depending on the process. In particular, rear-junction configurations are preferred in manufacturing as they allow for a greater proportion of lateral electron transport to transpire in the absorber rather than the front TCO. Therefore, the sheet resistance of the front side is lowered and restrictions on TCO process parameters are relaxed, leading to efficiency and cost benefits.

=== Absorber ===
The substrate, in which electron-hole pairs are formed, is usually n-type monocrystalline silicon doped with phosphorus. In industrial production of high efficiency SHJ solar cells, high quality n-type Czochralski silicon is required because the low-temperature process cannot provide the benefits of gettering and bulk hydrogenation. Photons absorbed outside the substrate do not contribute to photocurrent and constitute losses in quantum efficiency.

=== Buffer and carrier selection ===
==== Buffer Layers ====
Intrinsic amorphous silicon is deposited onto both sides of the substrate using PECVD from a mixture of silane (SiH_{4}) and hydrogen (H_{2}), forming the heterojunction and passivating the surface. Although intrinsic buffer layers are effectively non-conductive, charge carriers can diffuse through as the thickness is typically less than 10 nm. The buffer layer must be sufficiently thick to provide adequate passivation, however must be thin enough to not significantly impede carrier transport or absorb light. It is advantageous for the passivating layer to have a higher band gap to minimise parasitic absorption of photons, as absorption coefficient is partially dependent on band gap. Despite similarities between the buffer layer structure and Metal–Insulator–Semiconductor (MIS) solar cells, SHJ do not necessarily rely on quantum tunnelling for carrier transport through the low-conductivity buffer layer; carrier diffusion is also an important transport mechanism.

==== Window Layers ====
The selective contacts (also referred to as the "window layers") are then similarly formed by deposition of the p- and n-type highly doped amorphous silicon layers. Examples of dopant gases include phosphine (PH_{3}) for n-type and trimethylborane (B(CH_{3})_{3}) or diborane (B_{2}H_{6}) for p-type. Due to its defective nature, doped amorphous silicon (as opposed to intrinsic) cannot provide passivation to crystalline silicon; similarly epitaxial growth of any such a-Si layer causes severe detriment to passivation quality and cell efficiency and must be prevented during deposition.

===== Nanocrystalline window layer =====
Recent developments in SHJ efficiency have been made by deposition of n-type nanocrystalline silicon oxide (nc-SiO_{x}:H) films instead of n-type amorphous silicon for the electron contact. The material commonly referred to as "nanocrystalline silicon oxide" is actually a two-phase material composed of nanoscale silicon crystals embedded in an amorphous silicon oxide matrix. The silicon oxide has a higher band gap and is more optically transparent than amorphous silicon, whereas the columnar nanocrystals enhance vertical carrier transport and increase conductivity, thus leading to increased short circuit current density $J_{SC}$ and decreased contact resistance. The material band gap can be tuned with varying levels of carbon dioxide during PECVD. The replacement of amorphous silicon with nanocrystalline silicon/silicon oxide has already been integrated by some manufacturers on n-type, with p-type (hole contact) to follow in the near future. An optimised nanocrystalline hole contact was instrumental in producing the Lin, et al.. (2023) 26.81% power conversion efficiency world record.

=== Antireflection coating and conductive oxide ===
The dual purpose antireflection coating (ARC) and carrier transport layer, usually composed of Indium tin oxide (ITO), is sputtered onto both sides over the selective contacts. Indium tin oxide is a transparent conducting oxide (TCO) which enhances lateral conductivity of the contact surfaces without significantly impeding light transmission. This is necessary because the amorphous layers have a relatively high resistance despite their high doping levels, and so the TCO allows carriers to be transported from the selective contact to the metal electrodes.

For destructive interference antireflection properties, the TCO is deposited to the thickness required for optimum light capture at the peak of the solar spectrum (around 550 nm ). The optimum thickness for a single-layer ARC is given by;

$d=\frac{\lambda}{4\eta}$

where $d$ is the layer thickness, $\lambda$ is the desired wavelength of minimum reflection and $\eta$ is the material's refractive index.

Depending on the refractive index of the ITO (typically ~1.9), the optimum layer thickness is usually 70–80 nm. Due to thin-film interference, the ITO (a dull grey-black ceramic material) appears a vibrant blue colour at this thickness.

==== Alternative materials ====
Due to the scarcity of indium, alternative TCOs such as aluminium-doped zinc oxide (AZO) are being researched for use in SHJ cells. AZO has a much higher chemical sensitivity than ITO, which presents challenges for certain metallisation methods that require etching, such as nickel seed layer etch-backs and typically has a poorer interface contact to both p- and n-type amorphous layers. AZO may have long-term stability issues when cells are used in modules, which may require capping layers such as SiO_{x}.

Undoped tin oxide (SnO_{x}) has also been used successfully to produce indium-free TCOs on SHJ cells with an efficiency of 24.91%.

Enhancement of the optical and electronic properties of indium oxide based TCOs has been achieved through co-doping with cerium and hydrogen, which results in high electron mobility. Such films can be grown at temperatures sufficiently low to be compatible with the heat-sensitive SHJ production process. Indium oxide doped with cerium oxide, tantalum oxide and titanium oxide have also resulted in favourable electronic properties. The process is tunable through introduction of water vapour into the sputtering chamber in which hydroxyl radicals in the plasma are believed to terminate oxygen vacancies in the TCO film, leading to enhanced electron mobility and lower sheet resistance, however stability and contact resistance must be considered when using this method in SHJ cells.

==== Double-antireflection coating ====
Through evaporation, a double-antireflection coating of magnesium fluoride (MgF_{2}) or aluminium oxide (Al_{2}O_{3}) may be used to further reduce surface reflections, however this step is not currently employed in industrial production. AZO capping layers such as SiO_{x} can also act as a double AR coating. Such techniques were used to produce SHJ cells with world record power conversion efficiencies.

==== Role of work function ====
The TCO layer for SHJ cells should ideally have a high work function (ie. the energy difference between the Fermi level and the Vacuum level) to prevent formation of a parasitic Schottky barrier at the interface between the TCO and the p-type amorphous layer. This can be partially alleviated by increasing the doping of the p-type layer, which decreases the barrier width and improves open-circuit voltage ($V_{OC}$) and fill factor ($FF$). However increased doping increases junction recombination, diminishing $V_{OC}$ gains. Depositing a higher work function TCO such as tungsten oxide (WO_{x}) or tuning the deposition parameters of ITO can also reduce the barrier height; typically the latter is used due to the preferable optical properties of ITO.

=== Metallisation ===
Metal electrodes are required to contact the solar cell so that electricity can be extracted from it. The TCO alone is not conductive enough to serve this purpose. The electrodes on a bifacial solar cell are composed of a grid pattern on the front side and the rear side, whereas non-bifacial cells can have the entire rear side coated in metal. Interdigitated back contact cells have metal only on the rear. In the case of front grids, the grid geometry is optimised such to provide a low resistance contact to all areas of the solar cell surface without excessively shading it from sunlight.

==== Printed paste ====
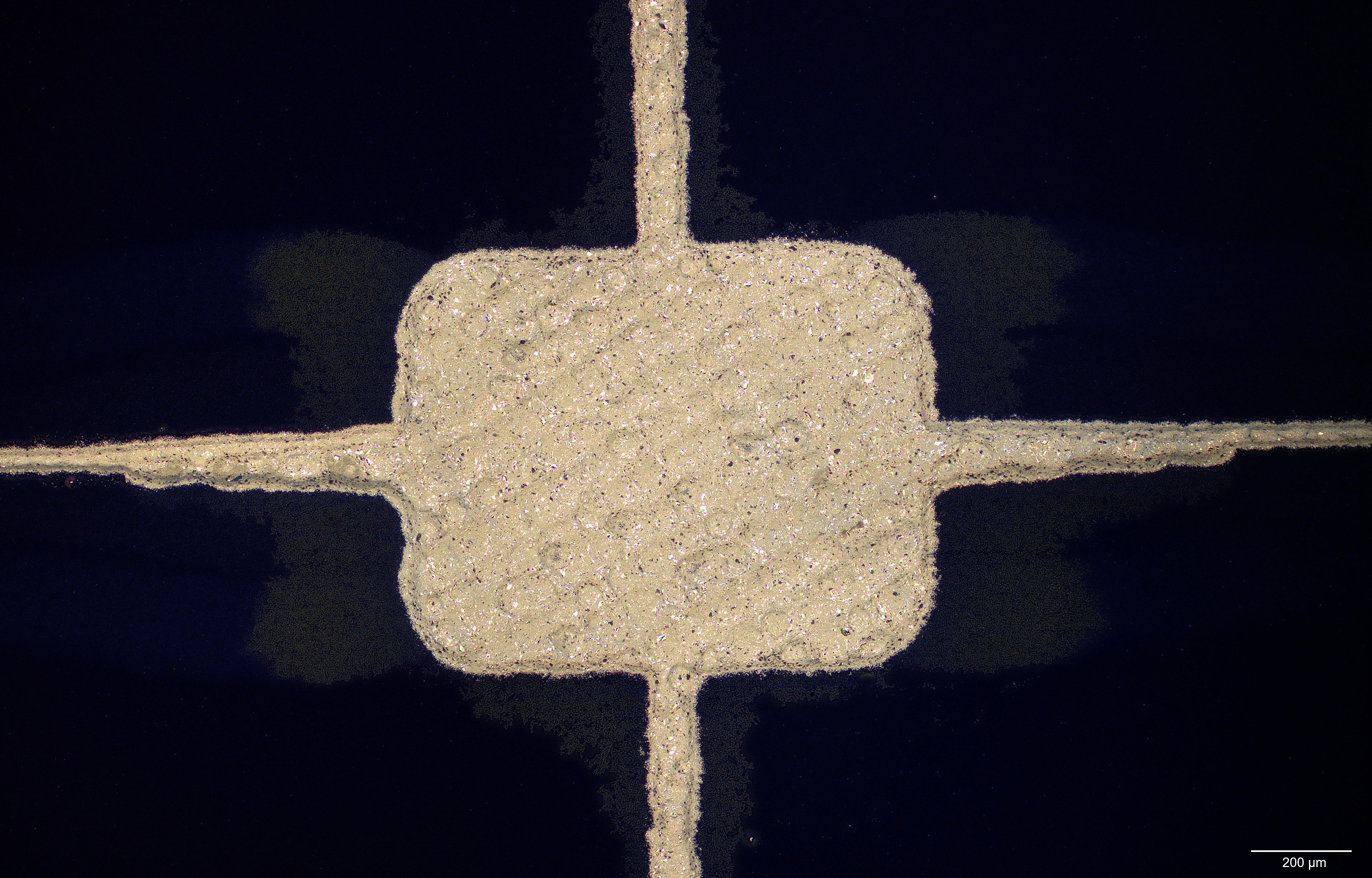
A microscope image of the solder pad (centre), a finger (horizontal) and a busbar (vertical) of a silver screen-printed heterojunction solar cell

Heterojunction solar cells are typically metallised (ie. fabrication of the metal contacts) in two distinct methods. Screen-printing of silver paste is common in industry as is with traditional solar cells, with a market share of over 98%. However low-temperature silver paste is required for SHJ cells. These pastes consist of silver particles combined with a polymer which crosslinks at a curing temperature of about 200 °C. These suffer major drawbacks including low grid conductivity and high silver consumption, volatile production costs or poor adhesion to the front surface. Despite their significantly higher cost, the resistivity of low-temperature silver pastes has been estimated to be 4–6 times higher than standard silver paste. To compensate for lowered conductivity, low-temperature silver pastes also consume more silver than conventional silver pastes, however silver consumption is trending downward as the development of screen-printing technology reduces finger linewidths. Improvements in the composition of low-temperature pastes are expected to further reduce silver consumption, such as through screen-printable silver-coated copper paste. Such pastes perform comparably to conventional low-temperature pastes, with up to 30% reduction in silver consumption. Silver-coated copper pastes are becoming an increasingly dominant metallisation technology amongst Chinese SHJ manufacturers into 2030, with 50% market share expected from 2024 to 2025.

A non-contact method of paste printing, Laser Pattern Transfer Printing, can be used to fabricate narrow fingers with a 1:1 aspect ratio. Paste is pressed into a grating, and an infrared laser is used to heat the paste from behind. The vaporising solvent expels the paste from the mold and onto the solar cell substrate. As contact screen printing exerts high forces on the cell, this alternative technique can reduce cell breakage, in particular for very thin wafers.

==== Printed ink ====
Silver nanoparticle ink can be deposited onto a SHJ solar cell using inkjet printing, or through contact deposition with a hollow glass capillary. Inkjet deposition has been reported to reduce silver consumption from 200 mg per cell to less than 10 mg per cell compared with traditional silver paste screen printing. Further reductions are possible with capillary deposition (known as "FlexTrail" as the capillary is flexible and trails across the wafer surface) leading to as little as 3 mg of silver deposited. Such a large reduction in silver has implications for the grid design to compensate for lower conduction, namely using a busbar-less design.

==== Electroplated ====
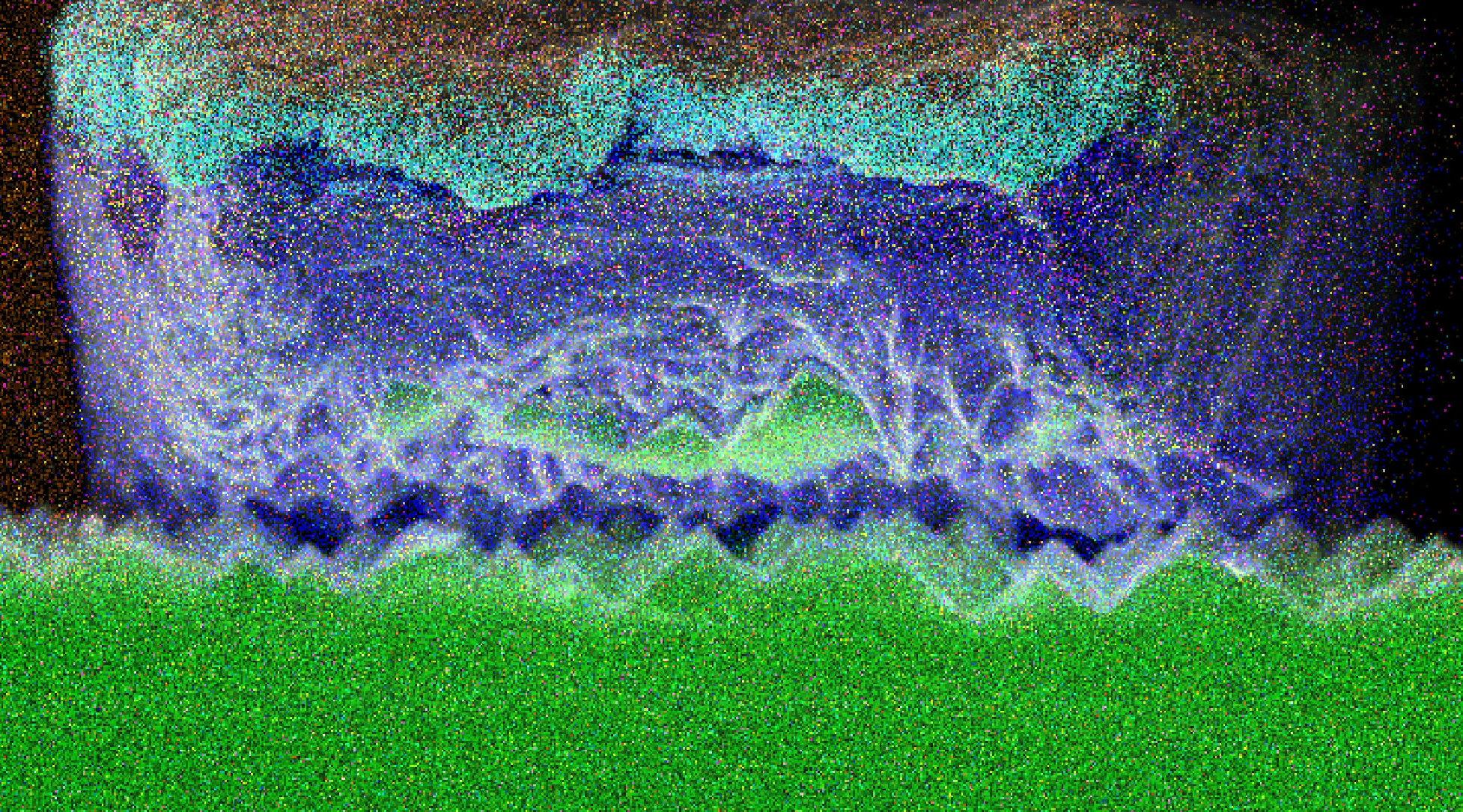
A SEM-EDS image of a Cu-plated/Sn-capped heterojunction solar cell. The colours are indicative of elements present.

A potentially silver-free alternative to printed electrodes uses electroplated copper. The conductivity of electroplated copper is similar to that of bulk copper. This has potential to increase the SHJ cell current density through decreasing grid resistance. Improved feature geometry can also be achieved. However industrial production is challenging as electroplating requires selective patterning using a sacrificial inkjet-printed or photolithographically-derived mask. As a result, electroplated SHJ cells are not currently manufactured commercially. Copper plated directly to the ITO also suffers from adhesion issues. Therefore, it is usually necessary to first deposit a thin (~1μm) seed layer of nickel through sputtering or electrodeposition. Alternatively, an indium seed layer can be developed in-situ through selective cathodic reduction of the doped indium oxide. Nickel and ITO layers also act as a diffusion barrier against copper into the cell, which is a deep-level impurity that causes severe degradation. A capping layer of silver or tin is generally also required to prevent corrosion of the copper fingers, especially in EVA-encapsulated modules.

Like all conventional solar cells, heterojunction solar cells are a diode and conduct current in only one direction. Therefore, for metallisation of the n-type side, the solar cell must generate its own plating current through illumination, rather than using an external power supply. This process is known as Light-induced Plating (LIP); as opposed to field-induced plating (FIP) for the p-type side. Alternatively, an electroless process may be used, which does not require electrical contact to the solar cell that complicates manufacturing. However, electroless plating is much slower than electroplating and may take hours rather than minutes to reach a suitable thickness.

=== Interconnection ===
SHJ temperature sensitivity has further implications for cell interconnection when manufacturing SHJ-based solar panels. High temperatures involved in soldering must be carefully controlled to avoid degradation of the cell passivation. Low temperature pastes have also suffered from weak adhesion to interconnecting wires or ribbons, which have consequences for module durability. Optimisation of these pastes and infrared soldering parameters, as well as careful selection of solder alloys, has led to increased success of interconnection processes on standard industrial equipment.

=== Multi-junction ===
One of many possible designs for a Heterojunction–Perovskite tandem solar cell.

Heterojunction–Perovskite tandem structures have been fabricated, with some research groups reporting a power conversion efficiency exceeding the 29.43% Shockley–Queisser limit for crystalline silicon. This feat has been achieved in both monolithic and 4-terminal cell configurations. In such devices, to reduce thermalisation losses, the wide bandgap Perovskite top cell absorbs high energy photons whilst the SHJ bottom cell absorbs lower energy photons. In a bifacial configuration, the bottom cell can also accept light from the rear surface.

In 2017, tandem solar cells using a SHJ bottom cell and Group III–V semiconductor top cells were fabricated with power conversion efficiencies of 32.8% and 35.9% for 2- and 3-junction non-monolithic stacks respectively.

In November 2023, the efficiency record for SHJ tandems was set at 33.9% by LONGi using a Perovskite top cell in a monolithic configuration. This is the highest efficiency recorded for a non-concentrated Two-junction solar cell.

=== Alternative heterojunction materials ===
Aside from the typical c-Si/a-Si:H structure, various groups have successfully produced passivated contact silicon heterojunction solar cells using novel semiconducting materials, such as between c-Si/SiO_{x}, c-Si/MoO_{x} and c-Si/poly-Si or c-Si/SiO_{x}/poly-Si (POLO; polycrystalline silicon on oxide). Hybrid inorganic–organic heterojunction solar cells have been produced using n-type silicon coated with polyaniline emeraldine base. Heterojunction solar cells have also been produced on multicrystalline silicon absorber substrates.

Band gap energies of semiconductors commonly used in heterostructures
Material	Band gap energy; E_{g} (eV)	Notes	Reference
c-Si	~1.12	Typical figure measured at 298 K	
a-Si:H	~1.7	Compared to c-Si, the wider band gap is attributable mostly to the high (~10% in SHJ solar cells) hydrogen content of amorphous silicon. The band gap energy is affected by the crystalline fraction and hydrogen content of the amorphous network, and is dependent on the method in which the thin film is prepared. A higher ratio of H_{2}:SiH_{4} during deposition increases the band gap energy.	
SiO_{x}:H	~1.4–3.3	Band gap increases as oxygen content $x$ increases where $0 <x<2$. A higher ratio of CO_{2}:SiH_{4} during deposition increases the band gap energy.	
MoO_{x}	~3		
CH_{3}NH_{3}PbX_{3}	~1.55–2.3	Methylammonium Lead Trihalide perovskite. The bandgap is tunable depending on the ratio of different halides, especially between bromine and iodine. Although the optimum band gap for single junction solar cells is 1.1–1.4 eV (based on the Shockley–Queisser limit), perovskites with a higher band gap may be suitable as the top cell in a tandem heterojunction solar cell.	
H_{2}NCHNH_{2}PbX_{3}	~1.48–2.23	Formamidinium Lead Trihalide perovskite. The bandgap is tunable depending on the ratio of different halides.	

=== Interdigitated Back Contact ===
Heterojunction solar cells are compatible with IBC technology, ie. the cell metallisation is entirely on the back surface. A Heterojunction IBC cell is often abbreviated to HBC. A HBC structure has several advantages over conventional SHJ cells; the major advantage is the elimination of shading from the front grid, which improves light capture and hence short circuit current density $J_{SC}$. Compared to PERC, conventional SHJ cells often suffer from poor $J_{SC}$ with values rarely exceeding 40 mA/cm^{2}, as some light is parasitically absorbed in the front amorphous silicon layers due to its high absorption coefficient. By removing the need for the front metal contact, as well as the front amorphous silicon contact, $J_{SC}$ can be recovered. As such, HBC cells have potential for high efficiencies; notably a long-standing world record heterojunction cell employed a HBC structure, at 26.7% efficiency fabricated by Kaneka with a $J_{SC}$ of 42.65 mA/cm^{2}. Despite HBC's high efficiency, double-sided cells are mainstream in industrial production due to their relatively simple manufacturing process. However, HBC cells may find specialised applications such as in vehicle-integrated PV systems where there are significant area constraints.

HBC cells are fabricated by localised doping of the rear side, in an alternating pattern of p- and n-type areas in an interdigitated pattern. The front side does not require a specific doping profile.

== Loss mechanisms ==
A well-designed silicon heterojunction module has an expected nominal lifespan of more than 30 years, with an expected average performance ratio of 75%. Failure, power losses and degradation of SHJ cells and modules can be categorised by the affected parameter (eg. open-circuit voltage, short-circuit current and fill factor). $V_{OC}$ losses are generally attributed to reduction in passivation quality or through introduction of defects, causing increased recombination. $J_{SC}$ losses are generally attributed to optical losses, in which less light is captured by the absorber (such as through shading or damage to module structures). $FF$ losses are generally attributed to passivation loss, and increases in series resistance or decreases in shunt resistance.

=== V_{OC} losses ===
Defects are sites at which charge carriers can inadvertently become "trapped", making them more likely to recombine through the Shockley-Read-Hall method (SRH Recombination). They are most likely to exist at interfaces (surface recombination), at crystal grain boundaries and dislocations, or at impurities. To prevent losses in efficiency, defects must be passivated (ie. become chemically and electrically neutral). Generally this occurs through bonding of the defect interface with interstitial hydrogen. In SHJ cells, hydrogenated intrinsic amorphous silicon is very effective at passivating defects existing at the absorber surface.

Understanding the behaviour of defects, and how they interact with hydrogen over time and in manufacturing processes, is crucial for maintaining the stability and performance of SHJ solar cells.

==== Light-induced Degradation ====
The behaviour of light-sensitive defect passivation in amorphous silicon networks has been a topic of study since the discovery of the Staebler–Wronski effect in 1977. Staebler and Wronski found a gradual decrease in photoconductivity and dark conductivity of amorphous silicon thin films upon exposure to light for several hours. This effect is reversible upon dark annealing at temperatures above 150 °C and is a common example of reversible Light-induced Degradation (LID) in hydrogenated amorphous silicon devices. The introduction of new band gap states, causing a decrease in the carrier lifetime, was proposed to be the mechanism behind the degradation. Subsequent studies have explored the role of hydrogen migration and metastable hydrogen-trapping defects in the Staebler–Wronski effect.

Amongst many variables, the kinetics and extent of the Staebler–Wronski effect is dependent on crystallite grain size in the thin film and the light soaking illuminance.

Some amorphous silicon devices can also observe the opposite effect through LID, such as the increase in $V_{OC}$ observed in amorphous silicon solar cells and notably SHJ solar cells upon light soaking. Kobayashi, et al. (2016) proposes that this is due to the shifting of the Fermi level of the intrinsic buffer layer closer to the band edges when in contact with the doped amorphous silicon selective contacts, noting that a similar reversal of the Staebler–Wronski effect was observed by Scuto et al. (2015) when hydrogenated a-Si photovoltaic devices were light-soaked under reverse bias.

Deliberate annealing of heterojunction cells in an industrial post-processing step can improve lifetimes and decrease surface recombination velocity. It has been suggested that thermal annealing causes interstitial hydrogen to diffuse closer to the heterointerface, allowing greater saturation of dangling bond defects. Such a process may be enhanced using illumination during annealing, however this can cause degradation before the improvement in carrier lifetimes is achieved, and thus requires careful optimisation in a commercial setting. Illuminated annealing at high temperatures is instrumental in the Advanced Hydrogenation Process (AHP), an inline technique for defect mitigation developed by UNSW.

The Boron–Oxygen complex LID defect is a pervasive problem with the efficiency and stability of cheap p-type wafers and a major reason that n-type is preferred for SHJ substrates. Stabilising wafers against B–O LID using the Advanced Hydrogenation Process has had variable success and reliability issues. Therefore gallium has been proposed as an economically feasible alternative p-type dopant for use in SHJ absorbers. Gallium doped cells have potential for higher stability and lower defect density than boron, with research groups achieving $V_{OC}$ exceeding 730 mV on gallium-doped p-type SHJ. However, gallium has a lower segregation efficiency than boron in Cz-grown silicon ingots, therefore having a similar problem to n-type in that less ingot length is used.

=== FF losses ===
Fill factor refers to how well the solar cell performs at its maximum power point compared to open- or short-circuit conditions.

Fill factor in high-efficiency solar cells is affected by several key factors: series resistance; bulk carrier lifetimes; the saturation current density; wafer resistivity and wafer thickness. These factors in turn affect the $V_{OC}$ and the diode ideality factor. To achieve a fill factor over 86%, a high efficiency heterojunction cell must have a very high shunt resistance, a negligible series resistance, high quality bulk silicon with very long minority carrier lifetime (~15 ms), excellent passivation (saturation current density below 0.8 fA/cm^{2}).

The diode ideality factor will approach 2/3 when the bulk wafer lifetimes increase, implying that Auger recombination becomes the dominant mechanism when bulk defect density is very low. An ideality factor of less than 1 will enable fill factors greater than 86%, as long as bulk lifetimes are high. Very high lifetimes are easier to achieve when the wafer thickness is reduced. At sufficiently high lifetimes, it is also advantageous to decrease the bulk doping concentration (increase the wafer resistivity $\rho$ > 0.3 Ω·cm) such that the wafer is under high injection conditions (the number of generated carriers is high compared to the dopant concentration).

=== Module degradation ===
Solar modules are exposed to various stressors when deployed in outdoor installations, including moisture, thermal cycling and ultraviolet light. Solar modules may be expected to be in service for decades, and these factors can reduce module lifespan if unaccounted for. The mechanisms of degradation include efficiency loss in the cell itself from cracking, gradual corrosion or defect activation; delamination of the module layers; UV degradation of the cell or lamination; encapsulant embrittlement or discolouration; and failure of the metal conductors (fingers, busbars and tabbing). Some significant design considerations for module longevity are in encapsulant choice, with significant reductions in the module's levelised cost of electricity (LCOE) for encapsulants with fewer adverse effects on module efficiency.

==== Potential-induced Degradation ====
Potential-induced degradation (PID) refers to degradation caused by high voltage stress in solar modules. It is one of the primary mechanisms of solar module degradation. Strings of modules in series can accumulate up to 1000 V in a photovoltaic system, and such a potential difference can be present over a small distance between the solar cells and a grounded module frame, causing leakage currents. PID is primarily an electrochemical process causing corrosion and ion migration in a solar module and cells, facilitated by moisture ingress and surface contamination. Sodium ions, which are suspected to leach from soda-lime glass, are particularly problematic and can cause degradation in the presence of moisture (even without high electric potential). This leads to reduction in the efficiency and lifespan of a PV system.

PID has been observed in all types of crystalline silicon solar cells, as well as thin-film solar cells, CIGS cells and CdTe cells. In research, PID can be replicated in accelerated aging tests by applying high bias voltages to a sample module, especially in an environmental chamber. In SHJ cells, PID is mostly characterised by the reduction in $J_{SC}$ caused by optical losses, and unlike the PID observed in other module technologies, the PID is mostly irreversible in SHJ modules with only a small recovery from applying the opposite bias. This indicates that some component of the PID occurs through a different mechanism in SHJ modules. It has been suggested that optical losses are caused by indium metal precipitating in the TCO. Degraded modules have also measured high concentrations of sodium ions deeper in the cell, which is consistent with PID caused from negative bias.

==== Encapsulant hydrolysis ====
Encapsulants are thermoplastic materials used to encase solar cells in modules for stability. In the lamination process, the cells are sandwiched between the encapsulant film and it is melted. Traditionally, the cheap copolymer Ethylene-vinyl acetate (EVA) has been used in crystalline silicon modules as encapsulant. After long duration exposure to moisture, EVA can hydrolyse and leach acetic acid with the potential to corrode the metal terminals or surface of a solar cell.

Non-bifacial modules are composed of a textured glass front and UV-stabilised polymer (commonly polyvinyl fluoride) backsheet, whereas bifacial modules are more likely to be glass–glass. The polymer backsheet, despite being more permeable to moisture ingress than glass–glass modules (which facilitates hydrolysis of EVA), is allegedly "breathable" to acetic acid and does not allow it to build up. As SHJ-based modules are more likely to be bifacial glass–glass, the risk of acetic acid buildup is claimed to be greater; however manufacturers have found the impermeability of glass–glass modules is generally sufficient to prevent EVA degradation, allowing modules to pass accelerated aging tests. Some studies have also found that glass–glass construction reduces the extent of degradation in EVA-encapsulated modules against glass–backsheet.

Additionally, ITO used in SHJ cells may be susceptible to acetic acid etching, causing $V_{OC}$ loss. Despite the higher cost, acetate-free and low water vapour permeability encapsulants such as polyolefin elastomers (POE) or thermoplastic olefins (TPO) show reduced degradation after damp-heat testing in comparison to EVA. It has been estimated that using POE or TPO over EVA can reduce the LCOE by nearly 3% as a result of improved module longevity.

Encapsulant-free module designs have also been developed with potential for reduced long term degradation and CO_{2} footprint. However reflection losses may arise from the lack of optical coupling between the front glass and the cell that encapsulant provides.

==== Encapsulant delamination ====
POE has higher resistance to water ingress compared to EVA, and hence prevents PID and other moisture-related issues. However, the lamination time is longer, and the adhesion between POE and the cell or glass is inferior to EVA. Delamination of encapsulant from poor adhesion can cause failure of the module. Therefore, POE is increasingly used as the centre layer in a three-layer coextruded polymer encapsulant with EVA, known as EPE (EVA–POE–EVA) which entails the benefits of both polymers.

==== UV stability ====
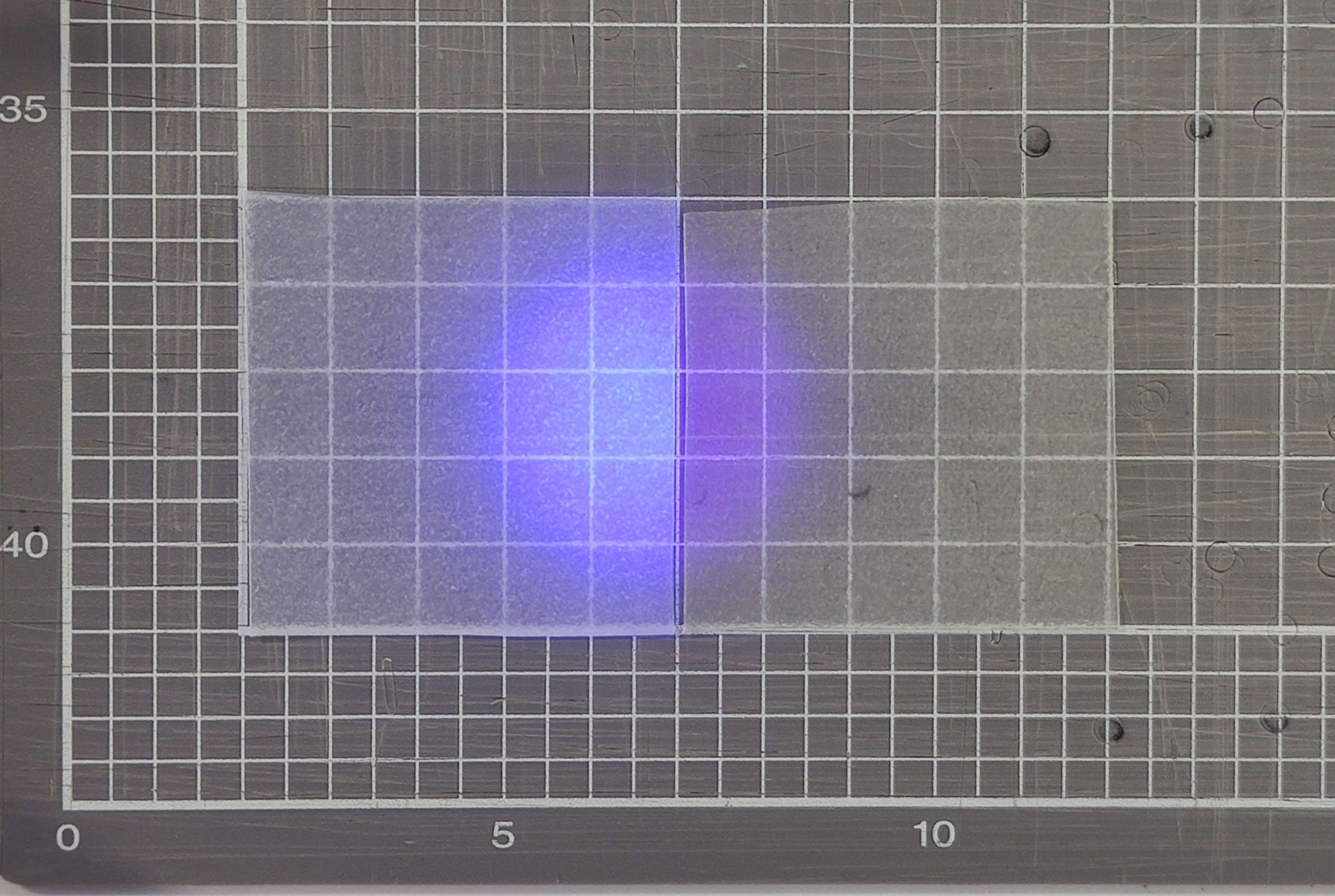
A comparison between EPE encapsulant samples with (left) and without (right) blue-fluorescing materials added, illuminated with an ultraviolet torch.

UV light can cause degradation of module encapsulants and backsheets, causing discolouration, embrittlement and delamination that reduces module lifespan and performance. Hot carriers generated by UV absorption can also cause oxidation of such materials. Furthermore, in high efficiency solar cells including heterojunction, UV causes changes in passivation that may decrease module performance. Studies involving extended UV light soaking of heterojunction modules indicate they are more susceptible to UV damage than PERC or PERT modules, where significant losses in fill factor and open-circuit voltages were observed. The proposed mechanism is the redistribution of hydrogen away from the passivated surface interfaces and into the amorphous layers.

UV cut-off encapsulant films have been used to protect SHJ cells from UV degradation, however the UV energy from such materials is not used by the solar cells. In 2023, encapsulant films containing UV down-converting phosphors such as Europium/Dysprosium-doped Strontium magnesium silicate (Sr_{2−x}MgSi_{2}O_{7−x}: Eu^{2+}, Dy^{3+}) were introduced for heterojunction solar cell applications, such as in EPE encapsulants. Such materials not only protect from UV degradation but also deliver optical gains from generated visible photons. Such films are being investigated for commercial use by Chinese heterojunction encapsulant manufacturers where tests of 60-cell modules saw power increases of 5 watts (approximately 1.5%) using the UV-converting film.

== Glossary ==
The following is a glossary of terms associated with heterojunction solar cells.

heterojunction
A junction between any two materials formed by their dissimilar band gap energies
selective contact
A layer of the solar cell (eg. doped amorphous silicon) that discriminates electrons from holes, allowing them to be separated. There are always two such contacts, doped in opposite polarities on the front and rear of the cell (relative to each other) depending on whether holes or electrons are to be collected.
passivation
Any phenomenon that reduces the likelihood of charge carriers recombining. Passivation of parasitic defects (eg. contaminant atoms, dangling bonds, crystal grain boundaries) refers to them being electrically neutralised such that they do not "trap" charge carriers, thereby preventing SRH Recombination. It is generally desirable for a solar cell to be well passivated, particularly at the interface between the metallic contact and the semiconductor. Passivation can also be achieved using an electric field, such as in Al-BSF solar cells (field effect passivation).
hydrogenation
A technique in which interstitial hydrogen is used to passivate regions of the solar cell
buffer layer
A very thin electrically inactive layer, typically intrinsic amorphous silicon, that provides surface passivation for the SHJ substrate
window layer
The (ideally) transparent selective contacts of a SHJ cell, typically made from amorphous or nanocrystalline silicon in a very thin layer
pyramids
The microscale pyramidal texture on the surface of a solar cell after alkaline isotropic etching procedure. Pyramids decrease solar cell surface reflectivity, allowing more light to be captured.
metallisation
The process by which the metal electrodes are formed on the positive and negative regions of the solar cell. These contact the solar cell to extract electricity from it.
