= Micromorph =

The portmanteau micromorph is a combination of the words microcrystalline and amorphous. It is used for a type of silicon based multijunction thin-film solar cell.

== The micromorph cell ==
Micromorph cells are thin film solar cells based on a multijunction–architecture consisting of two solar cells that are stacked on top of each other. While the thin amorphous silicon top cell absorbs the blue light, the thicker microcrystalline silicon bottom cell absorbs the red and near-infrared light, allowing this so-called tandem cell to cover a wider range of the solar spectrum.

Since the bandgaps of amorphous silicon (1.7 eV) and microcrystalline Silicon (1.1 eV) are well suited for tandem solar cells, the Shockley-Queisser limit of this cell allows conversion efficiencies of over 30%. In reality this limit can not be reached and typical stable efficiencies are about 9% (world record 11.7%). That is well over the stable efficiencies of single junction thin film silicon solar cells which are around 6%. One reason of the low costs of silicon thin film solar cells is its very low thickness (2 μm) compared to silicon wafer (200 μm). In the red and infrared wavelength range 2 μm of silicon are not enough to absorb all light and therefore 'light trapping' is needed.

The advantage of the micromorph approach is that it keeps the thickness of the amorphous top cell low. This reduces the effect of degradation induced by light (Staebler-Wronski effect). In multijunction cells top and bottom cell have to produce the same current. But the top cell is limited by the Staebler-Wronski effect and therefore light trapping and an intermediate reflector are needed to keep the thickness of the top cell low while increasing its current.

== The intermediate reflector ==
The intermediate reflector is a layer (IRL) of zinc oxide (ZnO intermediate reflector: ZIR) or silicon oxide (SiOx intermediate reflector: SOIR) between the top and the bottom cell. Due to its lower refractive index of around 2 comparing to the surrounding silicon (4) light is reflected back into the top cell. This increases the top cell current from around 10 mA/cm^{2} to 12 mA/cm^{2}, but reduces the bottom cell current by an equal amount.

== The word micromorph ==
This artificial word was first mentioned in a scientific publication of the University of Neuchâtel research group of Prof. Arvind Shah by the author J. Meier in the year 1995, but is based on long pioneering research of several authors and of several years. For a detailed list of publications, see the two main research group's publications website under http://pvlab.epfl.ch and under https://web.archive.org/web/20110222142422/http://www.fz-juelich.de/ief/ief-5/publicger/

Years later, other European, Japanese and American research groups started research activities in the field of improving the conversion efficiency of thin-film silicon solar cells by utilizing the stacked solar cell concept, naming the micromorph device 'hybrid' solar cell or naming the microcrystalline silicon absorber 'nanocrystalline' or even 'policrystalline' silicon.

The word 'micromorph' has been lately claimed to belong to an equipment manufacturer of silicon coating tools, but in a patent judgement, this claim has not been accepted by European patent offices.

== See also ==
- TEL Solar (former Oerlikon solar)
