= Photovoltaic Specialists Conference =

Photovoltaic Specialists Conference (PVSC)
- Status: Active
- Frequency: Annual
- Years active: 65
- Founded: April 14, 1964; 62 years ago in Washington, D.C., United States
- Most recent: PVSC 52
- Next event: PVSC 53
- Participants: 1800
- Area: Photovoltaics
- Sponsors: IEEE Photonics Society; IEEE Electron Devices Society
- Website: Photovoltaic Specialists Conference

The IEEE Photovoltaic Specialists Conference (also called PVSC) is the longest running technical conference dedicated to photovoltaics, solar cells, and solar power. The first PVSC was in 1961 at the NASA headquarters in Washington DC. The number of conference areas have expanded and now include PV reliability and solar resource. The conference has also had many diverse and distinguished keynote speakers like Sarah Kurtz who won the conference's William Cherry Award in 2012. PVSC is also where the most notable breakthroughs in PV are often first announced, such as record Solar-cell efficiency, new technologies like perovskite, TOPCon, heterojunction (HJT), and tandem cells, derivation of new algorithms, and discoveries of new phenomena such as Potential-induced degradation and light and elevated temperature induced degradation (LeTID).

PVSC is one of the three hosts of the quadrennial World Conference on Photovoltaic Energy Conversion (WCPEC), along with the International Photovoltaic Science and Engineering Conference (PVSEC) on the Asia-Pacific side and European Photovoltaic Solar Energy Conference and Exhibition (EU PVSEC) on the European side.

== William R. Cherry Award ==
PVSC honors scientists and researchers who have made significant contributions to the field of photovoltaics since 1980. Notable recipients include Joseph J. Loferski in 1981, Martin Green in 1990, Richard Swanson in 2002, Stuart Wenham in 2009, Pierre Verlinden in 2016 and Professor Harry Atwater in 2019.

== Women in PV Lunch ==
For at least the past ten years, PVSC has held a luncheon with speakers who have recognized the significant contribution of women in photovoltaics.

== Middle and high school competition ==
For over 20 years, PVSC has inspired high school youth to engage with scientists, explore and present their concepts at the conference, and compete to win prizes. Starting in 2020, the competition was expanded to include middle school students. The format was changed to encourage more creativity by asking students to write about how solar energy will change the future in the "Solar Future Narratives" competition, and to pitch solar energy projects that could positively impact their communities in the "Solar Energy Video Pitch" competition.

== Location history ==
PVSC #	Year	Location	Chair	Cherry Award
PVSC-1	1961	Washington, DC		
PVSC-2	1962	Washington, DC	Walter C. Scott	
PVSC-3	1963	Washington, DC	Walter C. Scott	
PVSC-4	1964	Cleveland, OH		
PVSC-5	1965	Greenbelt, MD	Paul Rappaport	
PVSC-6	1967	Cocoa Beach, FL	William R. Cherry	
PVSC-7	1968	Pasadena, CA	Robert E. Fischell	
PVSC-8	1970	Seattle, WA	Joseph J. Loferski	
PVSC-9	1972	Silver Springs, MD	Martin Wolf	
PVSC-10	1973	Palo Alto, CA	Richard L. Statler	
PVSC-11	1975	Scottsdale, AZ	Denis R. Curtin	
PVSC-12	1976	Baton Rouge, LA	Americo F. Forestieri	
PVSC-13	1978	Washington, DC	John V. Goldsmith	
PVSC-14	1980	San Diego, CA	Charles E. Backus	Paul Rappaport
PVSC-15	1981	Kissimmee, FL	Charles J. Bishop	Joseph J. Loferski
PVSC-16	1982	San Diego, CA	Henry W. Brandhorst, Jr.	Martin Wolf
PVSC-17	1984	Kissimmee, FL	Eugene L. Ralph	Henry W. Brandhorst
PVSC-18	1985	Las Vegas, NV	Allen M. Barnett	Eugene L. Ralph
PVSC-19	1987	New Orleans, LA	Lawrence L. Kazmerski	Charles E. Backus
PVSC-20	1988	Las Vegas, NV	Joseph F. Wise	David E. Carlson
PVSC-21	1990	Kissimmee, FL	John D. Meakin	Martin A. Green
PVSC-22	1991	Las Vegas, NV	Cosmo R. Barona	Peter A. Iles
PVSC-23	1993	Louisville, KY	Richard J. Schwartz	Lawrence L. Kazmerski
PVSC-24 (WCPEC-1)	1994	Waikoloa Village, HI (1st World Conference)	Dennis J. Flood (General Chair), Jurgen Schmid and Masafumi Yamaguchi (Vice Chairs)	Yoshihiro Hamakawa
PVSC-25	1996	Washington, DC	Eldon C. Boes	Allen M. Barnett
PVSC-26	1997	Anaheim, CA	Paul Basore	Adolf Goetzberger
PVSC-27 (WCPEC-2)	1998	Vienna, Austria (2nd World Conference)	Jurgen Schmid (General Chair), Kosuke Kurokawa and Sheila G. Bailey (Vice Chairs)	Richard J. Schwartz
PVSC-28	2000	Anchorage, AK	Ajeet Rohatgi	Christopher R. Wronski
PVSC-29	2002	New Orleans, LA	John Benner	Richard Swanson
PVSC-30 (WCPEC-3)	2003	Osaka, Japan (3rd World Conference)	Kosuke Kurokawa (General Chair), Lawrence L. Kazmerski and Bernard McNelis (Vice Chairs)	Ajeet Rohatgi
PVSC-31	2005	Lake Buena Vista, FL	Christopher R. Wronski	Timothy J. Coutts
PVSC-32 (WCPEC-4)	2006	Waikoloa Village, HI (4th World Conference)	Sheila Bailey (General Chair), Heinz Ossenbrink and Makoto Konagai (Vice Chairs)	Antonio Luque
PVSC-33	2008	San Diego, CA	Timothy J. Coutts	Masafumi Yamaguchi
PVSC-34	2009	Philadelphia, PA	Tim Anderson	Stuart Wenham
PVSC-35	2010	Honolulu, HI	Robert Walters	Richard R. King
PVSC-36 (WCPEC-5)	2010	Valencia, Spain (5th World Conference)	Giovanni De Santi (General Chair), Makoto Konagai and Robert Walters (Vice Chairs)	
PVSC-37	2011	Seattle, WA	David Wilt	Jerry M. Olson
PVSC-38	2012	Austin, TX	B.J. Stanbery	Sarah Kurtz
PVSC-39	2013	Tampa, FL	Ryne Rafaelle	Keith Emery
PVSC-40	2014	Denver, CO	Richard R. King	Ronald A. Sinton
PVSC-41 (WCPEC-6)	2014	Kyoto, Japan (6th World Conference)	Makoto Konagai (General Chair), A. Jager Waldau and B.J. Stanbery (Vice Chairs)	
PVSC-42	2015	New Orleans, LA	Steven A. Ringel	Christiana Honsberg
PVSC-43	2016	Portland, OR	Angus Rockett	Pierre Verlinden
PVSC-44	2017	Washington, DC	Angèle Reinders	Eli Yablonovitch
PVSC-45 (WCPEC-7)	2018	Waikoloa Village, HI (7th World Conference)	Alex Freundlich (General Chair), Marko Topič and Akira Yamada (Vice Chairs)	Vasilis Fthenakis
PVSC-46	2019	Chicago, IL	Sarah Kurtz	Harry Atwater
PVSC-47	2020	Virtual (COVID-19)	Seth Hubbard	James Sites
PVSC-48	2021	Virtual (COVID-19)	Sylvain Marsillac	Thorsten Trupke
PVSC-49	2022	Philadelphia, PA	Bill Shafarman	Stephen R. Forrest
PVSC-50	2023	San Juan, PR	Mariana Bertoni	Jenny Nelson
PVSC-51 (WCPEC-8)	2022	Milan, Italy	Alessandra Scognamiglio (General Chair), Yuzuru Ueda and Seth Hubbard (Vice Chairs)	
PVSC-52	2024	Seattle, WA	Arno Smets	Chris Xixiang Xu
PVSC-53	2025	Montreal, Canada (7th World Conference)	Tyler Grassman	
