= Vasilis Fthenakis =

Greek American chemical engineer

Vasilis M. Fthenakis
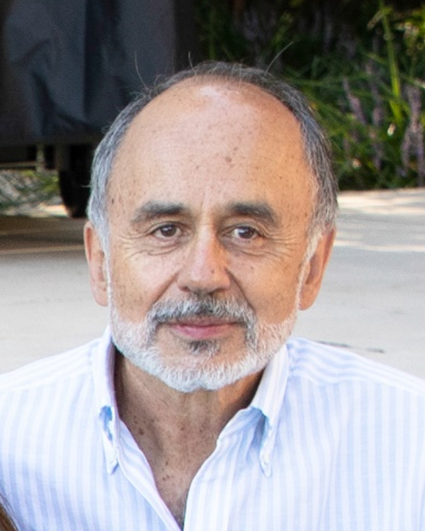
- Occupations: Chemical engineer, environmental scientist, author and academic

Academic background
- Education: Diploma, chemistry MS., chemical engineering PhD., fluid dynamics and atmospheric science
- Alma mater: University of Athens; Columbia University; New York University

Academic work
- Institutions: Columbia University

Vasilis M. Fthenakis is a Greek American chemical engineer, environmental scientist, author and academic. He is an adjunct professor, and founding director of the center for Life Cycle Analysis at Columbia University.

Fthenakis is most known for his research on the environmental sustainability of photovoltaic energy technologies and for demonstrating the feasibility of solar energy as a solution to meet US energy demands while addressing climate challenges. His publications comprise journal articles and books including Electricity from Sunlight: Photovoltaics Systems Integration and Sustainability and Onshore and Offshore Wind Energy: Evolution, Grid Integration and Impact. He has received awards such as a Certificate of Appreciation from the US Department of Energy in 2006, the Brookhaven National Laboratory's Certificate of Recognition in 2015, the 2018 IEEE William Cherry Award, and the 2022 Karl Böer Solar Energy Medal of Merit from the International Solar Energy Society.

Fthenakis is an elected Fellow of the American Institute of Chemical Engineers, the International Energy Foundation, and the Institute of Electrical and Electronics Engineers. Additionally, he has served as Editor-in-Chief of Green Energy and Sustainability, Section Editor-in-Chief of Energies, and associate editor for Progress in Energy.

== Education and early career ==
Fthenakis earned a diploma in chemistry from the University of Athens in 1975 while working as a chemist at ChemiResearch in Greece from 1974 to 1976. He then completed an MS in Chemical Engineering at Columbia University in 1978 and held research roles at Columbia's Catalysis Laboratory and Fossil Energy Laboratory. In 1980, he joined Brookhaven National Laboratory, working as a research engineer and senior scientist across departments focused on sustainable energy and environmental sciences. He received a PhD in fluid dynamics and atmospheric science from New York University in 1991, with a focus on toxic gas release modeling and mitigation using water spray systems.

== Career ==
Fthenakis continued his academic and research career at Columbia University, serving as an adjunct associate professor of earth and environmental engineering from 1995 to 2000, and has been an adjunct professor since 2006. In 2006, he became a senior research scientist and founded the Center for Life Cycle Analysis (CLCA), where he continues to serve as director. He also co-founded the Global Clean Water Desalination Alliance (GCWDA), where he served on the board of directors, leading efforts to integrate solar energy systems with desalination technologies. Concurrently, at Brookhaven National Laboratory, he served in various roles from 1980 to 2016 and has been a distinguished scientist emeritus since 2017. From 2002 to 2016, he led the National Photovoltaic Environmental Research Center and has coordinated international collaborations on life cycle assessment (LCA) under the direction of the US Department of Energy and the International Energy Agency.

== Contributions ==
Fthenakis has led collaborations on silane safety and lead-free solder technologies, conducted foundational life-cycle studies on thin-film photovoltaics and PV recycling, and anticipated regulatory trends concerning lead and cadmium, supporting industry adaptation. In later years, the scope of his research expanded to topics at the energy-water-environment nexus and he led applied research on solar-powered water desalination with applications in the United States and Chile.

In 2004, Fthenakis began studying life cycle analysis (LCA) to address what he identified as an unbalanced portrayal of photovoltaics' environmental impacts and started an international collaboration to update LCA studies on photovoltaics. He established an ad-hoc committee and organized scoping meetings with researchers from institutions such as the University of Utrecht, the Energy Research Center of the Netherlands, Chalmers University, the University of Stuttgart, Siena University, and Ambient Italia to assess the LCA needs of the photovoltaic industry.

Through related research, Fthenakis has developed and advocated for a proactive, long-term environmental strategy for photovoltaics, including recycling processes for end-of-life photovoltaic modules. In 1999, he organized a workshop to promote lead-free solder technology. From 2002 to 2005, he established a laboratory focused on recycling spent photovoltaic modules and manufacturing scrap, employing hydrometallurgical separation technologies and resulting in a patented method for separating copper, cadmium, and tellurium, with applications in cadmium telluride (CdTe) and copper indium gallium selenide (CIGS) technologies. He also conducted studies on optimizing the collection of end-of-life photovoltaics to reduce recycling costs. Recognizing the environmental concerns surrounding the growth of the CdTe and CIGS markets, he designed experiments simulating fire effects on photovoltaics using techniques such as NSLS-x ray diffraction analysis. In 2005, he led a European Union workshop, organized with the Joint Research Center and the German Ministry of the Environment, facilitating a US company's establishment of a manufacturing facility in Germany. In 2007, he launched and led a five-year International Energy Agency (IEA) Photovoltaic Environmental Health and Safety Task (Task 12), serving as the US Operating Agent until 2012.

Over the years, Fthenakis’ research has been highlighted by news outlets, including The New York Times, Science News, Environmental Science & Technology, IEEE Spectrum, Scientific American, Spiegel, and NRC Handelsblad.

== Publications ==
Fthenakis' research on photovoltaics and the environment has led to approximately 300 journal and conference papers, contributing to over 450 publications on energy and environmental topics. As of November 15, 2024, his publications have been cited 18,464 times and his h-index is 66. In 2007, he co-authored the Grand Plan for Solar Energy with Ken Zweibel and James Mason, a study demonstrating the feasibility of solar energy to meet most of the US electricity needs; this was the prelude of the detailed SunShot Solar Vision studies. Earlier, in 1993, he published his first book, Prevention and Control of Accidental Releases of Hazardous Gases, which was used by the chemical and oil refinery industries as a primer on the prevention of industrial disasters. His publications have also focused on electricity generation through renewable energy sources such as wind and solar.

== Personal life ==
Fthenakis is the son of Menelaos Fthenakis and Antonia Korkidis-Fthenakis, who died in the sinking of the SS Heraklion in Greece when he was 14 years old. He is married to Christina Georgakopoulos and has two children and two grandchildren.

== Awards and honors ==
- 2006 – Certificate of Appreciation, US Department of Energy
- 2018 – William Cherry Award, IEEE
- 2022 – Karl Böer Solar Energy Medal of Merit, International Solar Energy Society

== Bibliography ==
=== Selected books ===
- Prevention and Control of Accidental Releases of Hazardous Gases (1993) ISBN 978-0-471-28408-6
- Third Generation Photovoltaics (2012) ISBN 978-953-51-0304-2
- Electricity from Sunlight: Photovoltaics Systems Integration and Sustainability (2nd edition, 2018) ISBN 978-1-118-96380-7
- A Comprehensive Guide to Solar Energy Systems: With Special Focus on Photovoltaic Systems (2018) ISBN 978-0-12-811479-7
- Comprehensive Renewable Energy: Photovoltaic Solar Energy (2nd edition, 2022) ISBN 978-0-323-99011-0
- Onshore and Offshore Wind Energy: Evolution, Grid Integration and Impact (2nd edition, 2024) ISBN 978-1-119-85449-4
- Energy and Climate Change: Our New Future (2025) ISBN 978-0-443-21927-6

=== Selected articles ===
- Fthenakis, V. M., Kim, H. C., & Alsema, E. (2008). Emissions from photovoltaic life cycles. Environmental science & technology, 42(6), 2168–2174.
- Fthenakis, V., & Kim, H. C. (2009). Land use and electricity generation: A life-cycle analysis. Renewable and Sustainable Energy Reviews, 13(6–7), 1465–1474.
- Fthenakis, V. (2009). Sustainability of photovoltaics: The case for thin-film solar cells. Renewable and Sustainable Energy Reviews, 13(9), 2746–2750.
- Fthenakis, V., Mason, J., & Zweibel, K. (2009). The technical, geographical and economic feasibility for solar energy to supply the energy needs of the United States. Energy Policy, 37(2), 387–399.
- Turney, D., & Fthenakis, V. (2011). Environmental impacts from the installation and operation of large-scale solar power plants. Renewable and Sustainable Energy Reviews, 15(6), 3261–3270.
- Fthenakis, V. (2015). Considering the total cost of electricity from sunlight and the alternatives. Proceedings of the IEEE, 103(3), 283–286.
- Fthenakis, V., & Leccisi, E. (2021). Updated sustainability status of crystalline-silicon-based photovoltaic systems – Life-cycle energy and environmental impact reduction trends. Progress in Photovoltaics, 29(10), 1068–1077.
- Leccisi, E., & Fthenakis, V. (2021). Life-cycle energy demand and carbon emissions of scalable perovskite PV systems. Progress in Photovoltaics, 29(10), 1078–1092.
- Fthenakis, V., Yetman, G., Zhang, Z., Squires, J., Atia, A. A., Alarcon-Padilla, D.-C., Palenzuela, P., Vicraman, V., & Zaragoza, G. (2022). A solar energy desalination analysis tool, SEDAT, with data and models for selecting technologies and regions. Nature Scientific Data, 9(223), 1-20.
- Ginsberg, M., Esposito, D., & Fthenakis, V. (2023). Designing off-grid green hydrogen plants using dynamic polymer electrolyte membrane electrolyzers to minimize the cost of hydrogen production. Cell Reports Physical Science, 4(10), 101625.
