= TEL Solar =

TEL Solar Ltd
- Type: Business Unit of Tokyo Electron Ltd
- Industry: Photovoltaics
- Founded: 2006
- Headquarters: Truebbach, Switzerland
- Key people: Kiyoshi Sato, President
- Products: multi-junction thin-film silicon cells (Micromorph)
- Number of employees: 650+ (2012)
- Website: www.solar.tel.com

TEL Solar, formerly Oerlikon Solar, is a manufacturer of production equipment for the manufacturing of thin-film silicon cells, headquartered in Trübbach, Switzerland, near the border to Liechtenstein. The Japanese electronics and semiconductor company Tokyo Electron acquired the company of about 650 employees from OC Oerlikon in November 2012.

TEL Solar owns the patent for the double junction thin film silicon technology from 1993. Micromorph is the brand name describing the amorphous/microcrystalline silicon tandem cell. The two junctions consist of the amorphous silicon (a-Si) top cell and the microcrystalline silicon (μc-Si) bottom cell. TEL Solar was the first to integrate boron doped zinc oxyde deposited by low pressure chemical vapour deposition (LPCVD) as the transparent conductive oxide layer, and the first to commercialize the high-efficiency Micromorph process. The majority of its customers upgraded from amorphous single junction to micromorph (double junction, or tandem cell) technology. The installed production capacity at its customer sites cumulates to one gigawatt. The company maintains sales and service centers in the US, Europe, China, Taiwan, Korea, Singapore and Japan.

In January 2014, Tokyo Electron Ltd announced the closure of its micromorph technology development program it acquired from Oerlikon, while in July 2014, TEL Solar announced a new efficiency record for its micromorph module concept, with an independently certified solar conversion efficiency of 12.24%. TEL Solar's president, Kiyoshi Sato, noted: "Despite our decision to discontinue the solar business we are proud of the last result from our development team having achieved target and new world record."

== Market segment ==
TEL Solar is a provider of thin-film silicon PV module production equipment, end-to-end fabrication lines, process technology and services, for the automated mass-production of such modules.

== Grid parity ==
TEL Solar is currently offering equipment that produce PV panels that are 1.4 square meters in size, have a module efficiency of 10.8%, and a module production cost of US$0.50/watt. in 2012, TEL Solar emphasized that it had doubled the annual output of its standard manufacturing line and reduced the expected cost of ownership by over 50% over the past three years. These improvements were seen to put TEL Solars customers in a position to offer panels at a price that enable solar energy to be sold at prices comparable to retail electricity rates in regions such as Southern Europe and California.

== End-to-end manufacturing lines ==
TEL Solars possesses a fully automated thin-film solar module manufacturing lines (ThinFab 140) with an annual production capacity of 140 MW. The company highlights three key components of it in the latest generation production line:

1. TCO for depositing transparent conductive oxide (TCO) layers for front and back contacts
2. KAI MT for plasma enhanced chemical vapor deposition (PECVD) to build the amorphous and microcrystalline photosensitive layers and
3. LSS for laser patterning to produce serially connected cells.

In addition, TEL Solar claimed to be the only supplier of transparent conductive oxide (TCO) technology with haze on demand. This proprietary effect is seen to enable the trapping of light in the photovoltaic thin-film, maximizing conversion efficiency, thus directly enhancing the performance of its solar module and reducing its cost per watt-peak.

== Form factor ==
The company claimed its 1.4-m^{2} substrate to be the leading format for equipping silicon thin-film module production facilities, and that it became an industry standard through numerous installations. TEL Solar emphasized that the substrate it used, was the only one available for wide-scale implementations, and that its format had further advantages over other, larger substrates, including higher efficiency, lower cost of ownership per watt, lower shipment costs, and ease of installation.

== Micromorph module technology ==
The company stated that its amorphous/microcrystalline design enables module performance by capturing up to 50% more sunlight than conventional thin film silicon PV modules. The micromorph stacked-cell concept was pioneered and patented at the Institute of Microtechnology (IMT) of the University of Neuchâtel, Switzerland, and licensed to TEL Solar in 2003. A new world record PV module based on the micromorph concept with 12.24% efficiency was independently certified in July 2014.

== End-to-end module factory ==
TEL Solar offers its customers a complete manufacturing solution for thin film silicon, including the PECVD equipment for depositing the silicon layers, the LPCVD equipment to deposit thin film zinc oxide on the front and back of the silicon layers, the advanced laser systems to scribe cell lines and the equipment to encapsulate the active layers to form the finished module.

== See also ==
- Crystalline silicon (used for conventional solar cells)
- Energy Conversion Devices (ECD Solar)
- Emerging photovoltaics
- Solar cell
- Thin film solar cell#Production, cost and market
