= Allen Barnett =

American research professor

- Education: Carnegie Mellon University, University of Illinois
- Occupations: Researcher, Professor

Allen M. Barnett (born June 20, 1940) was an American research professor of electrical engineering at the University of Delaware. He was the principal investigator of the DARPA-funded Consortium for Very High Efficiency Solar cells. Barnett was the founder and CEO of solar-cell producer Astropower, Inc. He was also a Professor of Advanced Photovoltaics at the University of New South Wales (UNSW) School of Photovoltaic and Renewable Energy Engineering (SPREE) in Sydney Australia.

== Education ==
Barnett graduated from the University of Illinois at Urbana–Champaign in 1963 and earned his doctorate in electrical engineering from Carnegie Mellon University in 1966. He was a fellow of the Institute of Electrical and Electronics Engineers.

== Career ==
Barnett joined the University of Delaware (UD) as Director of the Institute of Energy Conversion and Professor of Electrical Engineering. He left UD in 1993, to dedicate his time to AstroPower Inc. which he founded in the early 1980s. He returned to UD in 2003 as the Executive Director of the Solar Power Program, Research Professor at the Department of Electrical Engineering and Computer Engineering and Senior Policy Fellow at the Center of Energy and Environmental Policy.

In 2005, Barnett was the manager and co-author of the winning proposal and subsequent UD subcontract in the $100 million DARPA Very High Efficiency Solar Cell (VHESC) programme. He was a co-inventor of a 38.5 percent efficient solar cell module built on advancements achieved on the previous DARPA VHESC project ($53 million). This was cited in the March 2010 issue of Progress in Photovoltaics, Solar Cell Efficiency Tables (version 35) as “probably the highest efficiency yet measured for the experimental conversion of sunlight to electricity by any means.”

Barnett joined the UNSW School of Photovoltaic and Renewable Energy Engineering in 2011.

Publications

Barnett published a number of research articles, and also contributed to a book, Renewable Energy: Sources for Fuels and Electricity.

== Recognition ==
Barnett was a recipient of the Boer Medal. He was named one of "The 50 Most Influential Delawareans of the Past 50 Years" in 2012 by Delaware Today. Dr. Barnett and his wife Marsha received first United Mitochondrial Disease Foundation Humanitarian Award 2001. Other awards held by Barnett include:

- IEEE William R. Cherry Award
- IEEE Fellow Award
- Karl W. Böer Solar Energy Medal of Merit
- P. Merriott W.H.O. Philanthropist of the year 2004

== The AstroPower Case ==
Barnett was involved in a financial fraud case along with Thomas Stiner, while he was the CEO of AstroPower Inc. The SEC filed a settled civil fraud action in the United States District Court for the District of Columbia against Allen Barnett, the former CEO, and Thomas Stiner, the former CFO, of AstroPower Inc. According to the complaint, they had made material misstatements, engaged in fraudulent accounting practices, and signed filings made with the Commission that they either knew or were reckless in not knowing, contained substantially fabricated and false financial statements.

The SEC charges that at the direction of Barnett and Stiner, AstroPower improperly recognized about $4 million in revenues from four transactions executed over the course of the second and third quarters of 2002. As a result of improperly recognizing revenue from these transactions, AstroPower’s net income was overstated by about $160,000 or 80 percent for the second quarter of 2002, and about $440,000 or 113 percent for the third quarter of that year, according to the SEC.

Barnett and Stiner agreed to permanent injunctions. Along with other sanctions, they agreed to the payment of civil penalties in the amount of $65,000 and $40,000, respectively.

A suit was filed in 2007 by AstroPower Liquidating Trust against their auditor, KPMG LLP, in which the company contends that AstroPower implemented its accounting practices at the direction of KPMG. The court recognized AstroPower’s allegations of “Breach of Contract,” “Professional Negligence,” and “Gross Negligence and Exemplary Damages,” for which KPMG was denied a motion to dismiss at the conclusion.
