= Stuart Wenham =

Stuart Wenham (15 July 1957, Sydney – 23 December 2017) was, at the time of his death, the director of the ARC Centre of Excellence in Advanced Silicon Photovoltaics and Photonics and Director of Academic Studies of the School of Photovoltaic and Renewable Energy Engineering at the University of New South Wales.

== Early life ==
Wenham grew up in Bexley North, a suburb of Sydney. On his graduation from the University of New South Wales (UNSW) in 1981, he received the university medal in electrical engineering.

== Solar power ==
With Dr Bruce Godfrey of UNSW, Wenham set up Australia's first solar cell manufacturing line. He invented advanced hydrogenation technology which boosted the efficiency of solar cells one hundredfold, a major contribution to the well-being of the planet and for which colleagues considered him "the Einstein of the solar world".

Wenham played a key role in commercialising the advanced hydrogenation technology, forging strong industry collaborations to ensure ongoing support for the advanced hydrogenation and related projects at the UNSW School of Photovoltaics and Renewable Energy (SPREE). He was also the Chief Technology Officer of Suntech Power Holdings Co., Ltd, at one time the world's leading supplier of solar cells.

== Recognition ==
Wenham's pioneering work with Professor Martin Green on solar cell technology won them the 1999 Australia Prize after they had held the record for solar energy conversion efficiency for decades. In 2008, Wenham was awarded the Clunies Ross Award for "contributions to solar cell development and commercialisation". In 2009 Wenham received the Cherry Award at the 34th IEEE Photovoltaic Specialists Conference in Philadelphia. In 2011 he received the J J Ebers Award from the International Electron Devices group of the IEEE. Wenham was awarded the UK Institution of Engineering and Technology's AF Harvey Engineering prize in 2013 for his breakthroughs in hydrogenation.

Wenham died on the morning of 23 December 2017 in Sydney from melanoma.
