= Sarah Kurtz =

American materials scientist

Sarah R. Kurtz is an American materials scientist known for her research on solar energy and photovoltaics, including the application of multi-junction solar cells in robotic spacecraft. Formerly a research fellow at the National Center for Photovoltaics and principal scientist at the National Renewable Energy Laboratory, she is a professor of materials science and engineering at the University of California, Merced.

== Education and career ==
Kurtz attended public schools in her hometown of Defiance, Ohio, and graduated in 1979 from Manchester College, majoring in chemistry and physics. She earned a Ph.D. in chemical physics in 1985 from Harvard University; her dissertation was Atmospheric pressure chemical vapor deposition of hydrogenated amorphous silicon, titanium nitride, and titanium dioxide thin films.

She joined the National Renewable Energy Laboratory (NREL) in 1985 as a post-doctoral researcher. She moved to the University of California, Merced in 2017.

== Recognition ==
Kurtz and fellow NREL scientist Jerry Olson won one of the 2007 Dan David Prizes "for their exceptional and profound contributions to the field of photovoltaic energy". In 2012 the IEEE Electron Devices Society gave her their William R. Cherry Award for her work on multi-junction cells. The US Clean Energy Education & Empowerment (C3E) Initiative gave her their 2016 Lifetime Achievement Award.

She was elected to the National Academy of Engineering in 2020, "for contributions to the development of GaInP/GaAs photovoltaic cells and leadership in solar cell reliability and quality". She became the first faculty member at UC Merced to be elected to the academy. In 2022, she was elected as an IEEE Fellow, "for contributions to photovoltaic devices and systems reliability".
