= Progress in Photovoltaics =

- Discipline: Energy and fuel
- Language: English
- Edited by: Martin A. Green

Publication details
- History: 1993–present
- Publisher: John Wiley & Sons
- Frequency: Monthly

Standard abbreviations
- ISO 4: Prog. Photovolt.

Indexing
- CODEN: PPHOED
- ISSN: 1062-7995 (print); 1099-159X (web)
- LCCN: 93657421
- OCLC no.: 25744745

Links
- Journal homepage

Progress in Photovoltaics is a monthly peer-reviewed scientific journal covering research on photovoltaics. It is published by John Wiley & Sons and the editor-in-chief is Martin A. Green (University of New South Wales). According to the Journal Citation Reports, the journal has a 2020 impact factor of 7.953, ranking it 17th out of 114 journals in "Energy & Fuels", 21st out of 160 journals in "Physics Applied", and 59th out of 336 journals in "Materials Science Multidisciplinary".
