= Peter Iles =

New Zealand cricketer (born 1926)

Personal information
- Full name: Peter Albert Iles
- Born: 23 December 1926; Palmerston North, New Zealand
- Batting: Left-handed
- Bowling: Legbreak

Domestic team information
- Years: Team
- 1946/47–1951/52: Auckland

Career statistics
Competition	First-class
Matches	2
Runs scored	58
Batting average	19.33
100s/50s	0/0
Top score	20
Balls bowled	360
Wickets	3
Bowling average	40.66
5 wickets in innings	0
10 wickets in match	0
Best bowling	3/46
Catches/stumpings	3/–
- Source: CricketArchive, 11 February 2021

Peter Albert Iles (born 23 December 1926) is an American engineer and a former New Zealand cricketer and association football player.

== Biography ==
Iles began his cricket career as a leg-spin bowler, but later concentrated on his batting. He played two first-class matches for Auckland, in 1946 and 1952. In 1948 he represented New Zealand Universities at association football as a goalkeeper, and in 1950 he played for the North Island team against the South Island team.

Iles studied at Auckland University College, graduating Bachelor of Science in 1948, and Master of Science with second-class honours in 1952. In the mid-1950s he spent some time in England before moving to Canada.

Iles later moved to the United States, settling in California and becoming an American citizen, where he worked as an engineer developing solar cells, including those used on early American satellites. In 1991, Iles received the William R. Cherry Award from the IEEE Electron Devices Society for his prolonged and sustained contribution to the field of photovoltaic conversion. He continued to publish on the subject until at least 2004, contributing a chapter, "Photovoltaic conversion: space applications", to the Encyclopedia of Energy published by Elsevier that year.
