= Joseph J. Loferski =

American physicist and engineering professor

Joseph John Loferski (August 7, 1925 – January 20, 1997) was an American physicist and a professor of engineering at Brown University. The New York Times called him "a pioneer in the development of solar cells". During his long and successful career he focused primarily on photovoltaic cells and their ability to convert the energy in light to electricity. Loferski also wrote and spoke extensively on the physics of semiconductor materials such as silicon, and methods of improving the efficiency of photovoltaic cells. Loferski's work and that of other early researchers proved that semiconductor devices could produce commercially viable, pollution-free electricity.

== Early life and education ==
Joseph J. Loferski was born in Hudson, Pennsylvania, the son of a coal miner. He went to college at University of Scranton and attended the University of Pennsylvania, earning his master's degree in 1949 and his doctorate in 1953. At RCA Laboratories in Princeton, New Jersey, Loferski and his colleague Paul Rappaport began researching photovoltaic cells and solar energy.

== Academic career ==
In 1961, Loferski joined the division of engineering at Brown University. He served as chairman of the division of engineering from 1968 to 1974, and as associate dean of the graduate school from 1980 to 1983. Loferski published over 150 technical papers and contributed chapters to five books. He was also the co-recipient of six patents in the semi-conductor field and was a fellow of the Institute of Electrical and Electronics Engineers. He chaired the 8th IEEE Photovoltaic Specialists Conference in 1970 and was awarded the William Cherry Award in 1981.

== Other activities ==
Loferski served as counselor at the European Space Research and Technology Centre in the Netherlands from 1967 to 1968 and in the 1970s he was an exchange fellow at the Polish Institute of Nuclear Research. He served as a science and technology counselor at the U.S. Embassy in Warsaw from 1985 to 1987. A native speaker of Polish, he also translated scientific and technical research originating in Eastern Europe. He worked as a consultant for the National Aeronautics and Space Administration (NASA), the Department of Defense and the U.S. Navy, as well as for private companies including RCA and Honeywell.

Dr. Loferski and his wife of 48 years, Sylvia D. Sweeda, raised six children. In 2002 he was posthumously inducted into the Rhode Island Heritage Hall of Fame.
