= Keith Emery =

Scientist and author

Keith Emery is a scientist at the National Renewable Energy Laboratory (NREL). He received his bachelor's degree in physics and his master's degree in electrical engineering from Michigan State University in 1976 and 1979, respectively. He has authored more than 330 publications, including journal articles, conference proceedings, and six book chapters.

Emery is a member of ANSI, IEC TC82 Working groups 2 and 7, and the ASTM E44.09 standards committees. He is a co-awardee with Spectrolab for the 2007 R&D 100 award and a co-awardee with Innovalight for the 2011 R&D 100 award. Emery was also awarded the 2012 World Renewable Energy Congress / Network Pioneer Award for outstanding contributions to renewable energy over many years and the use of renewable energy in his own daily life. He was also awarded the 2013, 39th IEEE PVSC Cherry Award and was listed as a highly cited researcher for 2002-2014 by Thomson Reuters.
