= Institute of Energy Conversion =

American solar energy research institute

The Institute of Energy Conversion (IEC), located at the University of Delaware is the oldest solar energy research institute in the world. It was established by Karl Boer in 1972 to pioneer research on thin film solar cells. The IEC performs independent research and collaborates with businesses alongside training undergraduate and graduate students in solar cell engineering. In 2011, the organization was the highest recipient of the United States Department of Energy's (DOE) SunShot Initiative and was awarded five grants totaling $9.1 million to research next generation solar cells to reduce the cost of solar cells by 75 percent by the end of the decade.
