= David L. Staebler =

American electrical engineer

David L. Staebler is an American electrical engineer.

He received his BSEE degree from Pennsylvania State University in 1962. The following year he was awarded an MSEE degree from the same institution. He became a member of the technical staff at RCA Laboratories in 1963. In 1970, he gained his Ph.D. in electrical engineering from Princeton University. While primarily remaining at RCA, he served as visiting professor at the Instituto de Fisica e Quimica de Sao Carlos, Brazil 1974–1975. In 1979–1980, he was a visiting staff member at Laboratories RCA Limited in Zurich, Switzerland. He was appointed as head of the Kinematic Systems group at RCA Laboratories in 1980. He later worked for Thomson Consumer Electronics and was the manager of the Materials Science Branch at the National Renewable Energy Lab. He serves as a consultant to Nanergy Corporation.

Dr. Staebler has performed research investigations on photochromism in materials, electrochromism, storage of holograms in electro-optic crystals, plus amorphous silicon solar cells produced by discharge. In 1980 he worked with Christopher R. Wronski to study light-induced metastable changes in the properties of hydrogenated amorphous silicon (a-Si:H); now known as the Staebler–Wronski effect.
