= David E. Carlson =

American physicist (1942–2019)

David Emil Carlson
- Born: March 5, 1942; Weymouth, Massachusetts, US
- Education: Rensselaer Polytechnic Institute
- Alma mater: Rutgers University
- Known for: Solar Cells and Panels, Amorphous silicon
- Spouse: Mary Ann Lewinski

David E. Carlson was an American physicist who invented thin film, amorphous silicon based, photovoltaic solar cells.

== Early life and career ==
David Carlson received his B.S. in physics from Rensselaer Polytechnic Institute (RPI) in 1963, and his Ph.D. in physics from Rutgers University in 1968. Having participated in the ROTC Program at RPI, Carlson entered the Army upon graduation, and saw combat in Pleiku, Vietnam. He left the armed service with the rank of Captain. Carlson also worked as a Research and Development Physicist at the U.S. Army Nuclear Effects Laboratory in 1968 and 1969. In 1970, Carlson joined RCA Laboratories as a member of the technical staff and worked in the areas of ion motion in glasses and insulators, glow-discharge deposition of films, and thin-film photovoltaic devices. In 1976, Carlson and Christopher Wronski co-invented the hydrogenated amorphous silicon (a-Si:H) solar cell. This development in solar energy led to world-wide efforts in applied and fundamental research of amorphous silicon-based technologies. In 1982 an RCA group led by A. Catalano demonstrated an amorphous silicon solar cell in excess of the 10% conversion efficiency considered a requirement for commercial success. In 1983, RCA spun off its amorphous silicon solar cell technology to the Solarex Corporation. Carlson and a group of scientists from RCA co-founded the Solarex Thin Film Division in Newtown, PA. Carlson became the deputy general manager and director of research of the Solarex Thin Film Division. In 1986, he received the Clark Award in Physics from the Franklin Institute in Philadelphia. In 1999, Solarex joined with BP to become BP Solarex, and then eventually BP Solar. Carlson retired in 2002. He died on October 16, 2019.

== Awards and recognition ==
- RCA Outstanding Achievement Award
- Ross Coffin Purdy Award of The American Ceramics Society
- Morris N. Liebmann and William R. Cherry Awards from The Institute of Electronics and Electrical Engineering
- Walton Clark Medal from The Franklin Institute
- Karl W. Boer Solar Energy Medal of Merit

== Publications ==
Carlson has more than 90 technical publications and over 30 US patents.
