= Martin Green (professor) =

Australian engineer and professor

Martin Green AM FRS FAA
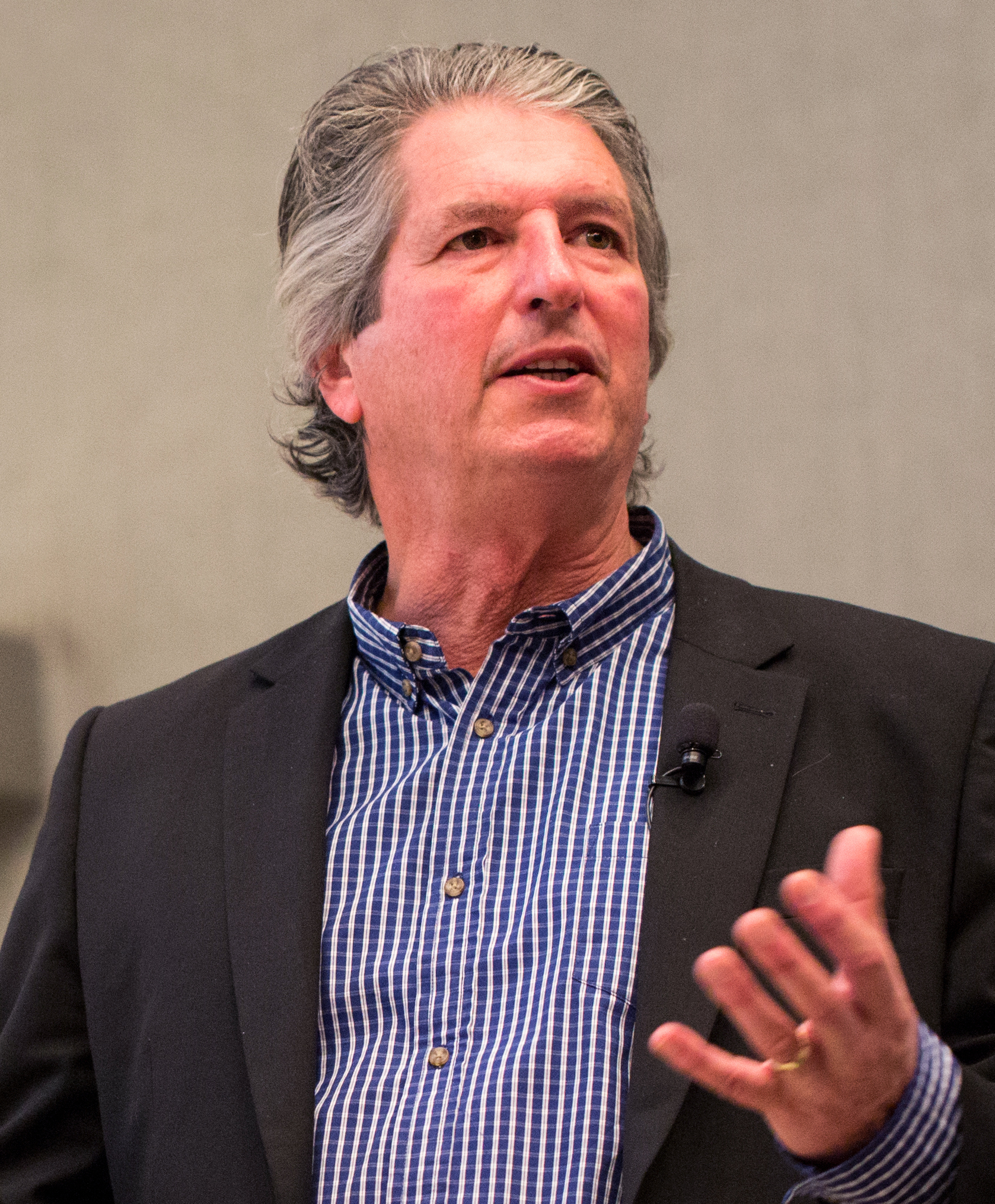
- Martin Green in 2015
- Born: Martin Andrew Green; 20 July 1948 (age 78); Brisbane, Australia
- Citizenship: Australian
- Education: University of Queensland (BSc); McMaster University (PhD)
- Awards: Pawsey Medal (1981); M. A. Sargent Medal (1994); Australia Prize (1999); Right Livelihood Award (2002); Millennium Technology Prize (2022); VinFuture Prize (2023)
- Scientific career
- Fields: Thermal engineering
- Workplaces: University of New South Wales
- Thesis: Properties and applications of the metal-insulator-semiconductor (MIS) tunnel diode (1974)
- Doctoral advisor: John Shewchun
- Website: research.unsw.edu.au/people/scientia-professor-martin-green

Martin Andrew Green AM FRS FAA (born 20 July 1948) is an Australian engineer who specialises in photovoltaics. He is a Scientia professor of Photovoltaic and Renewable Energy Engineering at the University of New South Wales (UNSW), where he directs the Australian Centre for Advanced Photovoltaics. Green is best known for his development of the Passivated Emitter and Rear Cell (PERC) in 1983, a technology that significantly increased the conversion efficiency of silicon solar cells, reduced the cost of solar energy and powers over 90% of all solar panels globally today.

He is widely considered the "father of modern photovoltaics", and has won many prizes and awards achievements such as Pawsey Medal in 1981, the M. A. Sargent Medal in 1994, the Japan Prize in 2021 and the Millennium Technology Prize in 2022. Green is one of the world's most highly cited researchers (top 0.1% in field) and has been an author or co-author of over 800 research papers in the field of photovoltaics. He is editor-in-chief of the academic journal Progress in Photovoltaics and holds fellowships with the Royal Society of London, the Australian Academy of Science, the Australian Academy of Technology and Engineering and the Royal Society of New South Wales.

== Early life and education ==
Martin Andrew Green was born in Camp Hill, Queensland on 20 July 1948.

He was educated at the selective Brisbane State High School, where he graduated as dux of the school in 1965. At the University of Queensland, he completed a Bachelor of Engineering in1970 and a Master of Engineering in 1972. He then completed his PhD on a Commonwealth Scholarship at McMaster University in Canada, supervised by John Shewchun, where he demonstrated that traditional silicon solar cell p-n junctions could be advantageously replaced by tunnelling metal-insulator-semiconductor structures.

== Research ==
In 1974, at the University of New South Wales, he set up the Australia's first solar research lab, the Solar Photovoltaics Group, which worked on the development of silicon solar cells. In the late 1970s, his group was developing world record cell voltages by using tunnel oxide passivated contacts (now known as TOPCon). In 1983, using the tunnelling approach, Green and Andrew Blakers developed the first 18% efficient silicon cell, surpassing the previous record of 16.5%. Since then, his team has developed the world's first 19%, 20%, 21%, 23%, 24% and 25% efficient silicon cells, which were amongst his 14 successive world records in the area.

In 1983, he developed the Passivated Emitter and Rear Cell (PERC), a solar cell with passivated emitter and rear surfaces. In 1989, his team published the first paper on PERC technology, which had 22.8% efficiency, the highest ever reported for a silicon cell. As of 2021, his PERC solar cell that he invented accounts for 91.2% of worldwide silicon solar module production.

In 1984, he developed the buried contact solar cell at UNSW with Stuart Wenham, produced 30% more energy than competing technologies and 20% cheaper to produce. In the 1990s, the technology was the largest manufactured solar cell technology in Europe.

Green has also made several theoretical contributions to the field, including the first identification of Auger Recombination as placing the most severe bounds on silicon cell performance, developing the methodology to calculate these bounds and discussing cell designs capable of limiting performance. He was also the first to explore "non-ergodic" light trapping schemes based on the crystallographically-defined pyramidal structures used in all modern silicon cells.

Green has supervised over 120 PhD students who have contributed to the field of photovoltaics, including:

- Andrew Blakers who helped develop the first 18% efficient silicon cell
- Stuart Wenham who developed the use of lasers in cell processing and the large-scale commercialisation of copper plating
- Richard Corkish, the CEO of the Australian Centre for Advanced Photovoltaics
- Alistair Sproul, Head of School of Photovoltaics and Renewable Energy Engineering at UNSW
- Shi Zhengrong, Chairman and CEO of Suntech Power
- Aihua Wang and Jianhua Zhao who worked on the PERC technology which they won the Queen Elizabeth Prize for and founders of China Sunergy
- Ximing Dai, Chief Technology Officer for JA Solar Holdings
- Xiaojing Hao, Professor of Photovoltaics and Renewable Energy Engineering at UNSW

Green is currently the editor-in-chief of the academic journal Progress in Photovoltaics.

== Awards and honours ==
=== Awards ===
Green has received many awards including:

- 1981: Pawsey Medal (Australian Academy)
- 1981: Edgeworth David Medal
- 1988: Award for Outstanding Achievement in Energy Research
- 1990: IEEE William R. Cherry Award
- 1991: Eureka Prize for "outstanding contribution to the development of high efficiency photovoltaic solar cells"
- 1992: CSIRO External Medal, alongside Dr Stuart Wenham
- 1994: Clunies Ross Technology Innovation Award
- 1994 M. A. Sargent Medal
- 1995: IEEE J.J. Ebers Award for "sustained technical leadership in the field of silicon photovoltaic solar energy conversion"
- 1999: Australia Prize in the energy science and technology theme with Dr Stuart Wenham
- 1999: Sir Lionel Hooke Award
- 1999: World Federation of Engineering Organizations Medal of Engineering Excellence (inaugural award)
- 2000: Gold Medal from the Spanish Engineering Academy
- 2000: Millennium Award from the World Renewable Congress
- 2001: Centenary Medal "for service to Australian society and science in photovoltaics
- 2002: Right Livelihood Award for "his dedication and outstanding success in the harnessing of solar energy, the key technological challenge of our age."
- 2003: Karl Böer Solar Energy Medal of Merit Award from the University of Delaware
- 2004: World Technology Network Award for Energy
- 2006: Finalist, European Inventor of the Year, together with Dr Stuart Wenham
- 2007: SolarWorld Einstein Award
- 2008: New South Wales Scientist of the Year Award
- 2008: New South Wales Science & Engineering Award in the category of Environment, Water and Climate Change Sciences
- 2009: ENI award
- 2009: Zayed Future Energy Prize finalist, recognised at the award ceremony for his groundbreaking research in photovoltaic (PV) technology that will result in increased efficiencies, bringing solar energy closer to grid parity.
- 2010: CSIRO Eurkea Prize for Leadership in Science
- 2012: Collaborative Innovation Award, together with Dr Stuart Wenham
- 2012: Member of the Order of Australia "for service to science education as an academic and researcher, particularly through the development of photovoltaic solar cell technology, and to professional associations."
- 2013: Fellow of the Royal Society of London

His nomination for the Royal Society reads:

Professor Green is cited for his extensive and distinguished contributions to photovoltaic science and technology. These include identifying the fundamental limits upon silicon solar cell performance and then leading his team to demonstrate experimental devices approaching this limit, with 25% cell efficiency now demonstrated. This is over 50% relatively higher in performance than at the beginning of his work. He has also developed innovative commercial versions of these high performance devices and pioneered the field of "third generation" photovoltaics, investigating advanced photovoltaic device concepts targeting Carnot-like solar conversion efficiencies.

- 2015: James Cook Medal of the Royal Society of New South Wales for his "significant contribution to photovoltaic science and technology"
- 2016: Ian Wark Medal and Lecture
- 2018: The Global Energy Prize for research, development and educational activities in the field of photovoltaics that have revolutionized the efficiency and costs of solar photovoltaics, making this now the lowest cost option for bulk electricity supply
- 2021: Japan Prize for "development of high-efficiency silicon photovoltaic devices"
- 2022: Millennium Technology Prize for his invention of Passivated Emitter and Rear Cell (PERC)
- 2023: Leigh Ann Conn Prize by the University of Louisville, for low-cost, high efficiency silicon solar cells
- 2023: Queen Elizabeth Prize for Engineering for his invention of PERC solar photovoltaic technology, alongside Andrew Blakers, Aihua Wang, and Jianhua Zhao.
- 2023: VinFuture Prize along with M. Stanley Whittingham, Rachid Yazami, and Akira Yoshino for "pioneering the breakthrough in green energy production with the invention of solar cells enhanced by Passivated Emitter and Rear Contact (PERC) technology"
- 2024: Sydney Ferries named a brand new Parramatta River-class ferry after Martin Green
- 2025: IET Faraday Medal for "his outstanding and sustained work in the field of renewable energy"

=== Honours ===
Green is also a fellow at many academic institutes including:

- 1989: Fellow of the Institute of Electrical and Electronics Engineers
- 1991: Fellow of the Australian Academy of Science
- 1992: Fellow of the Australian Academy of Technology and Engineering
- 2013: Fellow of the Royal Society, London
- 2017: Fellow of the Royal Society of New South Wales
- 2018: Celebrated Members of Institute of Electrical and Electronics Engineers Electron Devices Society
