= Dangling bond =

State of an immobilized atom in chemistry

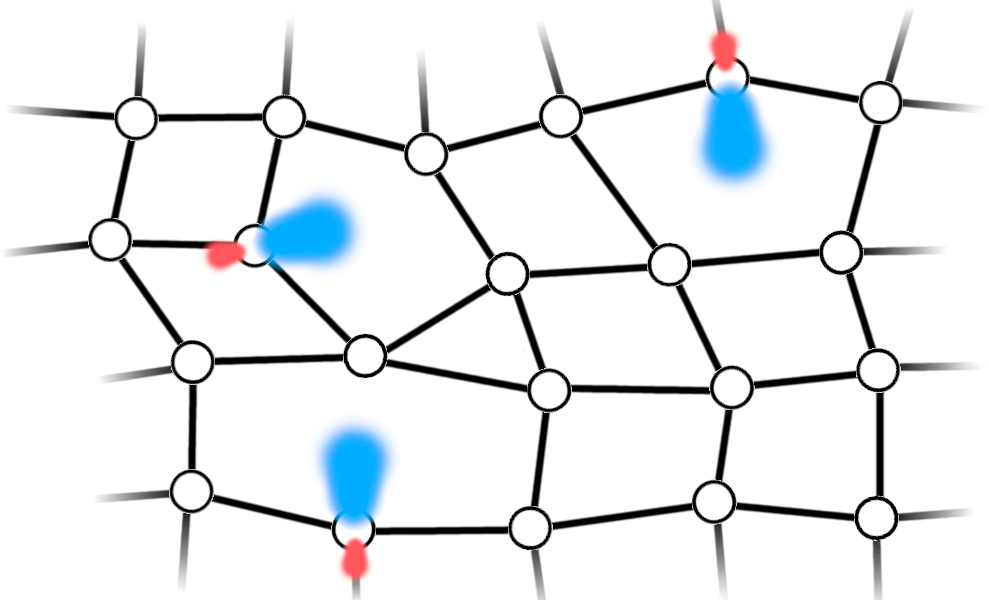
A schematic illustration of dangling bonds in amorphous silicon. The dangling bonds are depicted as blue-red hybrid sp^{3} orbitals.

In chemistry, a dangling bond is an unsatisfied valence on an immobilized atom. An atom with a dangling bond is also referred to as an immobilized free radical or an immobilized radical, a reference to its structural and chemical similarity to a free radical.

When speaking of a dangling bond, one is generally referring to the state described above, containing one electron and thus leading to a neutrally charged atom. There are also dangling bond defects containing two or no electrons. These are negatively and positively charged respectively. Dangling bonds with two electrons have an energy close to the valence band of the material and those with none have an energy that is closer to the conduction band.

== Properties ==
In order to gain enough electrons to fill their valence shells (see also octet rule), many atoms will form covalent bonds with other atoms. In the simplest case, that of a single bond, two atoms each contribute one unpaired electron, and the resulting pair of electrons is shared between them. Atoms that possess too few bonding partners to satisfy their valences and that possess unpaired electrons are termed "free radicals"; so, often, are molecules containing such atoms. When a free radical exists in an immobilized environment (for example, a solid), it is referred to as an "immobilized free radical" or a "dangling bond". A dangling bond in (bulk) crystalline silicon is often pictured as a single unbound hybrid sp^{3} orbital on the silicon atom, with the other three sp^{3} orbitals facing away from the unbound orbital. In reality, the dangling bond unbound orbital is better described by having more than half of the dangling bond wave function localized on the silicon nucleus, with delocalized electron density around the three bonding orbitals, comparable to a p-orbital with more electron density localized on the silicon nucleus. The three remaining bonds tend to shift to a more planar configuration. It has also been found in experiments that Electron Paramagnetic Resonance (EPR) spectra of amorphous hydrogenated silicon (a-Si:H) do not differ significantly from the deuterated counterpart, a-Si:D, suggesting that there is hardly any backbonding to the silicon from hydrogen on a dangling bond. It also appeared that the Si-Si and Si-H bonds are about equally strong.

=== Reactivity ===
Both free and immobilized radicals display very different chemical characteristics from atoms and molecules containing only complete bonds. Generally, they are extremely reactive. Immobilized free radicals, like their mobile counterparts, are highly unstable, but they gain some kinetic stability because of limited mobility and steric hindrance. While free radicals are usually short-lived, immobilized free radicals often exhibit a longer lifetime because of this reduction in reactivity.

=== Magnetic ===
The presence of dangling bonds can lead to ferromagnetism in materials that are normally magnetically inactive, such as polymers and hydrogenated graphitic materials. A dangling bond contains/consists of an electron and can thus contribute its own net (para)magnetic moment. This only happens when the dangling bond electron does not pair its spin to that of another electron. Ferromagnetic properties in various carbon nanostructures can be described using dangling bonds and may be used to create metal-free organic spintronics and polymeric ferromagnetic materials (see Applications). Creating dangling bonds with unpaired electrons can, for example, be achieved by cutting or putting large mechanical strain on a polymer. In this process, covalent bonds between carbon atoms are broken. One electron can end up on each of the carbon atoms that originally contributed to the bond, leading to two unpaired dangling bonds.

=== Optical ===
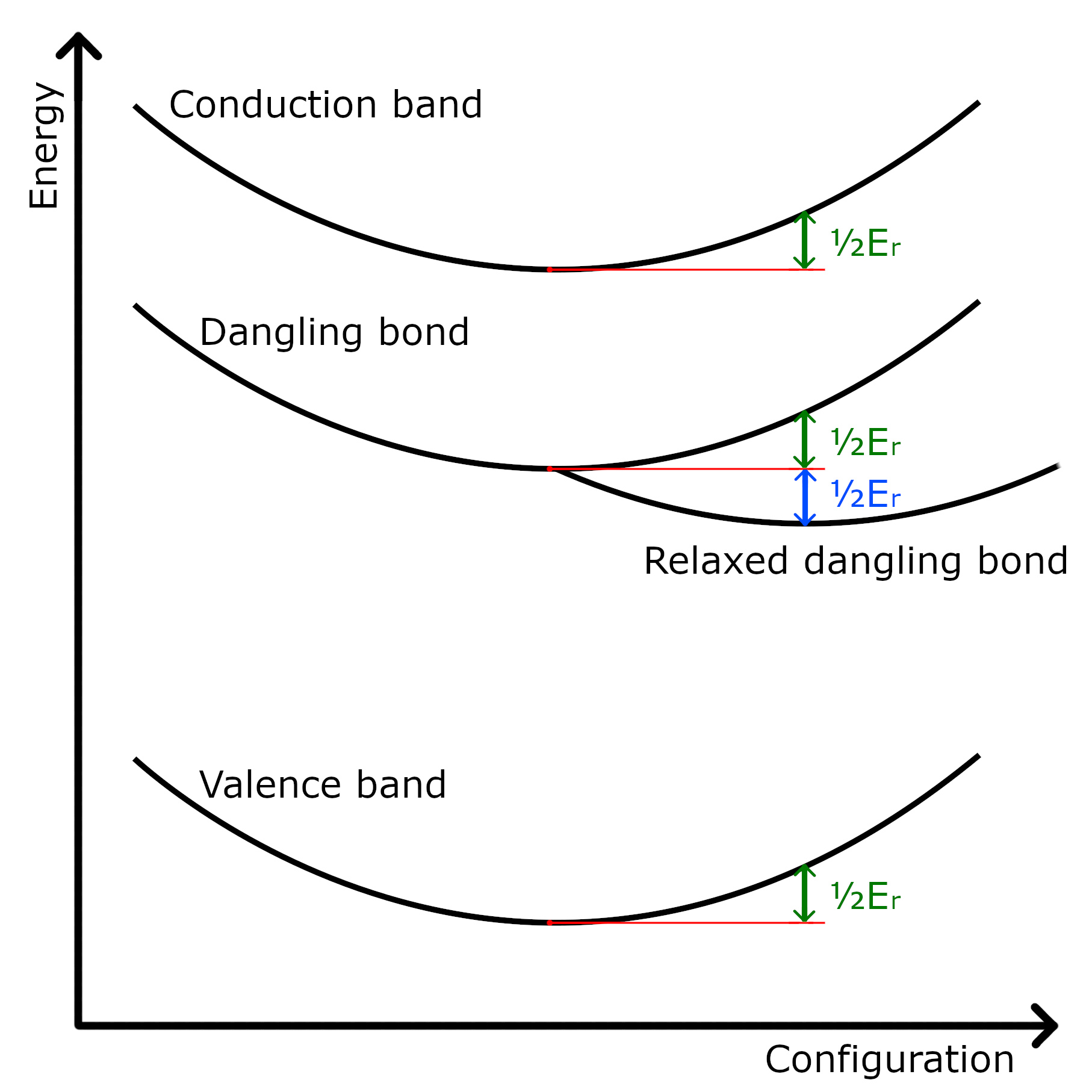
A configuration-coordinate diagram of the valence band, conduction band and dangling bond energy band in silicon. The arrows indicate the relaxation energies.

A dangling bond adds an extra energy level between the valence band and conduction band of a lattice. This allows for absorption and emission at longer wavelengths, because electrons can take smaller energy steps by moving to and from this extra level. The energy of the photons absorbed by or emitted from this level is not exactly equal to the energy difference between the bottom of the conduction band and the dangling bond or the top of the valence band and the dangling bond. This is due to lattice relaxation which causes a Franck-Condon shift in the energy. This shift accounts for the difference between a tight-binding calculation of these energy differences and the experimentally measured energies.

Another way in which the presence of dangling bonds affects the optical properties of a material is via polarization. For a material with dangling bonds, the absorption intensity depends on the polarization of the absorbed light. This is an effect of the symmetry in which the dangling bonds are distributed over the surface of the material. The dependence only occurs up to the energy at which an electron can be excited to the level of the gap but not to the valence band. This effect along with the polarization dependence disappearing after the dangling bonds have been annealed, shows that it is an effect of the dangling bonds and not just of the general symmetry of the material.

== Induced ==
In hydrogenated silicon, dangling bonds can be induced by (long) exposure to light. This causes a decrease in the photoconductivity of the material. (This is the most named explanation for the so-called Staebler-Wronski effect.) The mechanism of this is thought to be as follows: The photon energy is transferred to the system which causes the weak Si-Si bonds to break, leading to the formation of two bound radicals. The free electrons being localized and being very close together is an unstable state, so hydrogen atoms "move" to the site of the breakage. This causes the electrons to be delocalized further apart which is a more stable state. For a hydrogen content of around 10%, the dangling bonds from only a very small fraction of displaced hydrogen atoms can lead to observable EPR signal increases. The diffusion of hydrogen plays a key role in the process and explains why long illumination is required. It has been found that illumination under increased temperatures increases the rate at which light-induced dangling bonds form. This can be explained by the increased hydrogen diffusion.

It is thought that the formation mechanism of intrinsic dangling bonds (in hydrogenated silicon) is very similar to that of light induced dangling bonds, except that the energy source is heat rather than photons. This explains why the intrinsic dangling bond density is negligible at room temperature.

Light can also induce dangling bond formation in materials with intimately related valence alternation pairs (IVAP), such as a-As_{2}S_{3}. These IVAP defects consist of a dangling bond containing two electrons (D^{−}) and a dangling bond containing no electrons (D^{+}). When one of these pairs is illuminated, it can capture an electron or an electron hole resulting in the following reactions:

D^{+}D^{−} + e^{−} → D^{0}D^{−}

D^{+}D^{−} + h^{+} → D^{+}D^{0}

Here, D^{0} is an uncharged dangling bond.

== Surface ==
Schematic depiction of a semiconductor surface with the (001) plane exposed. The surface atoms will reorganize to pair dangling bonds, lowering the overall energy but creating some surface strain. In general, reorganization of surface atoms can shift several layers of atoms near the surface from their original position.

Surfaces of silicon, germanium, graphite (carbon) and germanium-silicide are active in EPR measurements. Mainly group 14 (formerly group IV) elements show EPR signals from a surface after crushing. Crystals of elements from groups 13 to 15 prefer to have the (110) plane exposed as a surface. On this surface, an atom of group 13 has 3/4 dangling bond, and an atom of group 15 has 5/4 dangling bond. Because of dehybridization of surface orbitals (caused by the decreased number of nearest neighbor atoms around the surface atom), a group 13 atom will have a largely unfilled dangling orbital since it has valence 3 and makes three bonds, while a group 15 atom will have a fully occupied dangling orbital at the surface. In that case, there is hardly any unpaired electron density, which results in a weak EPR signal for such materials. Clean cleaved surfaces of such materials form paired electron localized states on alternate sites resulting in a very weak to no EPR signal. Not well-cleaved surfaces and microcracks obtained from crushing, cleaving, abrading, neutron or high-energy ion irradiation or heating and rapid cooling in vacuum give a measurable EPR signal (a characteristic signal in Si at g = 2,0055). The presence of oxygen and hydrogen gas affects the EPR signal from microcracks by affecting the single electron spin centers. The gas molecules can get trapped and, when staying close to a spin center, affect the EPR signal. When a microcrack is sufficiently small, the wave functions of the dangling bond states extend beyond the surface and can overlap with wave functions from the opposite surface. This can create shear forces in the crystal surface, causing atom layers to realign while creating dangling bonds in the process.

Due to the reactivity of dangling bonds, the semiconductor native oxide will form due to adsorption of gas molecules, the only remaining dangling bonds are located at oxygen vacancies. Dangling bonds form an sp^{3}-hybridized bond with the adsorbed molecule, which have a metallic character. They are often the only defect sites present on atomic semiconductors, which provide such "soft centers" for molecules to adsorb to. When no gas adsorption is possible (for example for clean surfaces in vacuum), the surface energy can be reduced by reorganizing bonding electrons, creating lattice strain in the process. In case of the (001) surface plane of silicon, a single dangling bond on each atom will be formed, while pairing the other electron with a neighboring atom. Removal of dangling bond surface states on the silicon (001) surface from the band gap can be achieved by treatment of the surface with a monolayer of selenium (alternatively, sulfur was proposed). Selenium can attach to the silicon (001) surface and can bind to surface dangling bonds, bridging between silicon atoms. This releases the strain in the silicon surface and terminates the dangling bonds, covering them from the outside environment. When exposed, dangling bonds can act as surface states in electronic processes.

== In semiconductors ==
Some allotropes of silicon, such as amorphous silicon, display a high concentration of dangling bonds. Besides being of fundamental interest, these dangling bonds are important in modern semiconductor device operation. Hydrogen introduced to the silicon during the synthesis process is well known to saturate most dangling bonds, as are other elements such as oxygen, making the material suitable for applications (see semiconductor devices).

The dangling bond states have wave functions that extend beyond the surface and can occupy states above the valence band. The resulting difference in surface and bulk Fermi level causes surface band bending and the abundancy of surface states pins the Fermi level.

For the compound semiconductor GaAs, stronger electron pairing is observed at the surface, making for almost filled orbitals in arsenic and almost empty orbitals for gallium. Consequently, the dangling bond density at the surface is much lower and no Fermi level pinning occurs.

In doped semiconductors, surface properties are still dependent on the dangling bonds, since they occur in a number density of around 10^{13} per square centimeter, compared to dopant electrons or holes with a number density of 10^{14} to 10^{18} per cubic centimeter which are thus much less abundant on the material surface.

== Passivation (silicon photovoltaics) ==
By definition, passivation is a treatment process of the surface of the layers to reduce the effects of the surrounding environment. In photovoltaics (PV) technology, passivation is the surface treatment of the wafer or thin film in order to reduce the surface and some of the bulk recombination of the minority carriers. There are two main ways to passivate the surface of the silicon wafer in order to saturate the dangling bonds: field-effect passivation of the surface with a dielectric layer of SiO_{x}, also known as \Atalla passivation", and hydrogen passivation, which is one of the chemical methods used for passivation.

=== Hydrogen passivation ===
Hydrogen passivation is one way to saturate these dangling bonds. This passivation process is carried out by one of the following mechanisms: deposition of a thin film from silicon nitride SiNx on the top of the polycrystalline silicon layer, or passivation by remote plasma hydrogen passivation (RPHP). In the latter method, hydrogen, oxygen, and argon gases react inside the chamber, then, the hydrogen is dissociating to the atomic hydrogen under the plasma condition to diffuse into the silicon interface to saturate the dangling bonds. This saturation reduces the interface defect state, where the recombination takes place.

=== Dielectric layer passivation ===
Passivation by a dielectric layer on the top of crystalline silicon (c-Si) wafer, also called "tunnel passivation" is one of the passivation techniques used most widely in PV technology. This technique combines both chemical passivation and field-effect passivation. This strategy is based on the formation of a dielectric layer (mostly silicon dioxide SiO_{2}, aluminum oxide Al_{2}O_{3}, or silicon nitride (SiN_{x}) on the top of the c-Si substrate be the mean of thermal oxidation or other deposition techniques such as atomic layer deposition (ALD). In the case of the formation of SiO_{x} by thermal oxidation, the process acts as chemical passivation since, on the one hand, the formation of the oxide layer reacts with the dangling bonds on the surface wherein it reduces the defects states at the interface. On the other hand, since there are fixed charges (Q_{f}) in the dielectric film, these fixed charges establish an electric field that repels one type of charge carrier and accumulates the other type at the interface. This repletion assures reducing one type of the charge carriers concentration at the interface wherein the recombination decreases.

== Applications ==
=== Catalysis ===
In experiments by Yunteng Qu et al., dangling bonds on graphene oxide were used to bind single metal atoms (Fe, Co, Ni, Cu) for applications in catalysis. Metal atoms were adsorbed by oxidizing metal from a foam and coordinating the metal ions to the dangling bonds on the oxygen of the graphene oxide. The resulting catalyst had a high density of catalytic centers and showed high activity, comparable to other non-noble metal catalysts in oxygen reduction reactions while maintaining stability in a wide range of electrochemical potential, comparable to Pt/C electrodes.

=== Ferromagnetic polymers ===
An example of an organic ferromagnetic polymer is presented in an article by Yuwei Ma et al.: by cutting with ceramic scissors or stretching a piece of Teflon tape, a network of strongly coupling dangling bonds arises on surfaces where the polymer was broken (from cutting or in strain-induced cavities). In the case of weak structural deformation, where only very few dangling bonds are formed, the coupling is very weak and a paramagnetic signal is measured in EPR analysis. Annealing Teflon under an argon atmosphere at 100 °C to 200 °C results also in ferromagnetic properties. However, annealing close to the melting temperature of Teflon makes the ferromagnetism disappear. Under longer air exposure, the magnetization is reduced due to adsorbed water molecules. It also appeared that no ferromagnetism would develop under annealing Teflon under water steam or cutting in a H_{2} environment.

=== Computational chemistry ===
In computational chemistry, a dangling bond generally represents an error in structure creation, in which an atom is inadvertently drawn with too few bonding partners, or a bond is mistakenly drawn with an atom at only one end.
