= Christopher R. Wronski =

Photovoltaic cell researcher

Christopher R. Wronski was an electrical engineer and Professor Emeritus at Pennsylvania State University, noted for his pioneering research in photovoltaic cells including discovery of amorphous silicon solar cell and the Staebler–Wronski effect.

Christopher Wronski was born in Warsaw, Poland in 1939 as the son of Bogdan and Irene Wronski. Along with his brother and mother he lived in Poland during World War II. At the age of six, his family was reunited in England where his father, a Polish Naval officer, was stationed. Wronski received both his B.S. in Physics in 1960 and his Ph.D. in Physics from Imperial College, London in 1963.From 1963 to 1967, he worked at the 3M Research Laboratories in St. Paul, Minnesota. In 1967, he joined the RCA David Sarnoff Research Laboratory in Princeton, New Jersey. At RCA, his work with David Carlson led to the invention of thin film hydrogenated amorphous silicon solar cells. In 1976, together with David Staebler, he discovered the Staebler-Wronski effect, which describes reversible, light-induced changes in the optoelectronic properties of hydrogenated amorphous silicon. A seminal paper by Staebler and Wronski has now been cited more than 2,000 times. In 1978, Chris joined the Exxon Research Laboratories where he was a member of the team that developed optical enhancement for amorphous silicon solar cells. Together with David E. Carlson, he received the 1984 IEEE Morris N. Liebmann Memorial Award "for crucial contributions to the use of amorphous silicon in low-cost, high-performance photovoltaic solar cells." In 1987, Dr. Wronski joined the faculty in the Department of Electrical Engineering at Penn State University where he continued his research on amorphous silicon solar cells. He was elected an IEEE Fellow in 1990 "for contributions to the understanding and application of hydrogenated amorphous silicon-based materials", and received the 2000 William R. Cherry Award from the IEEE Photovoltaic Specialists Conference. Dr. Wronski succumbed to pancreatic cancer on October 22, 2017.

== Selected works ==
- Wronski, C. R. M., Ph.D. Dissertation, Imperial College, Univ. London (1963).
- Wronski, C R M (1967). "The size dependence of the melting point of small particles of tin". British Journal of Applied Physics. 18 (12). IOP Publishing: 1731–1737. Bibcode:1967BJAP...18.1731W. doi:10.1088/0508-3443/18/12/308. ISSN 0508-3443.
