= Staebler–Wronski effect =

The Staebler–Wronski Effect (SWE) refers to light-induced metastable changes in the properties of hydrogenated amorphous silicon.

The defect density of hydrogenated amorphous silicon (a-Si:H) increases with light exposure, causing an increase in the recombination current and reducing the efficiency of the conversion of sunlight into electricity.

It was discovered by David L. Staebler and Christopher R. Wronski in 1977. They showed that the dark current and photoconductivity of hydrogenated amorphous silicon can be reduced significantly by prolonged illumination with intense light. However, on heating the samples to above 150 °C, they could reverse the effect.

== Explanation ==
=== Some experimental results ===
- Photoconductivity and dark conductivity decrease rapidly at first before stabilizing at a lower value.
- Interruptions in the illumination have no effect on the subsequent rate of change. Once the sample is illuminated again, the photoconductivity will drop as though there was no interruption.

=== Suggested explanations ===
The exact nature and cause of the Staebler–Wronski effect is still not well known. Nanocrystalline silicon suffers less from the Staebler–Wronski effect than amorphous silicon, suggesting that the disorder in the amorphous silicon Si network plays a major role. Other properties that could play a role are hydrogen concentration and its complex bonding mechanism, as well as the concentration of impurities.

Historically, the most favored model has been the hydrogen bond switching model. It proposes that an electron-hole pair formed by the incident light may recombine near a weak Si–Si bond, releasing energy sufficient to break the bond. A neighbouring H atom then forms a new bond with one of the Si atoms, leaving a dangling bond. These dangling bonds can trap electron-hole pairs, thus reducing the current that can pass through. However, new experimental evidence is casting doubt on this model. More recently, the H collision model proposed that two spatially separated recombination events cause emission of mobile hydrogen from Si–H bonds to form two dangling bonds, with a metastable paired H state binding the hydrogen atoms at a distant site.

== Effects ==
The efficiency of an amorphous silicon solar cell typically drops during the first six months of operation. This drop may be in the range from 10% up to 30% depending on the material quality and device design. Most of this loss comes in the fill factor of the cell. After this initial drop, the effect reaches an equilibrium and causes little further degradation. The equilibrium level shifts with operating temperature so that performance of modules tend to recover some in the summer months and drop again in the winter months. Most commercially available a-Si modules have SWE degradation in the 10–15% range and suppliers typically specify efficiency based on performance after the SWE degradation has stabilized. In a typical amorphous silicon solar cell the efficiency is reduced by up to 30% in the first 6 months as a result of the Staebler–Wronski effect, and the fill factor falls from over 0.7 to about 0.6. This light induced degradation is the major disadvantage of amorphous silicon as a photovoltaic material.

== Methods of reducing the SWE ==
- Using nanocrystalline silicon instead of amorphous silicon
- Operating at a higher temperature. This can be accomplished by integrating the PV in a photovoltaic thermal hybrid solar collector (PVT).
- Stacking one or more thinner layers of amorphous silicon together with other materials to form a multijunction solar cell. The higher electric field which applies in the thinner layers appears to reduce the SWE.
