= SunShot Initiative =

Solar energy in the United States

The SunShot Initiative is a program administered by the Energy Technologies Office within the U.S. Department of Energy. The program supports solar energy adoption with the goal of reducing the cost of solar power for American consumers. It operates through partnerships with private companies, universities, state and local governments, nonprofit organizations, and national laboratories.

== Background ==
The U.S. Department of Energy (DOE) launched the SunShot Initiative in 2011 with the goal of reducing the cost of solar photovoltaic energy in the United States. The program aimed to make solar power cost-competitive with other energy sources, strengthen the domestic solar supply chain, and support research and development in solar energy technologies. The initiative also sought to reduce reliance on fossil fuels in favor of renewable energy sources. A stated goal of the program was to reduce carbon emissions to 20 percent of their 1990 peak levels by 2050.

To advance these goals, the DOE worked with local governments to streamline solar energy policy implementation. Through the "Solar America" program, the DOE provided funding to 25 major U.S. cities to demonstrate the practical application of the SunShot Initiative’s objectives. This in turn would facilitate the study of effectiveness in implementation processes in an urban setting, and provide an idealized planning model based on already-implemented policies, their effects, and potential challenges that could be encountered for reference, and create future implementation in other U.S. cities. According to the cost/benefit analysis of cities participating in the Solar America program, these DOE efforts were geared towards incentivizing more U.S. cities to implement alternative energy source policies locally. As well as increase the availability of viable policies that can be used in order to facilitate the development of a broader national or state policy.

This initiative is meant to increase the availability of photovoltaic sources as viable alternatives to fossil fuels. As well as increase further analysis on the costs and benefits of solar power in the United States, through a comparative study on the mechanics of policy implementation in order to more effectively realize the overarching goal of the SunShot initiative. The growth of the solar market in the United States, as a result of the SunShot initiative, has greatly increased the accessibility to solar powered technology and increased its general utility throughout the country, by reducing costs to consumers. The DOE has created these incentives in order to: (1)facilitate the increase of research and development, and (2) to promote renewable energy sources amid the globalized calls for a solutions to climate change/global warming.

The federal government invested $282 million in FY 2015 to fund the SunShot Initiative. According to the SunShot Q4 2016/Q1 2017 Solar Industry Update report, the United States installed 14.8 GW of PV in 2016, an increase of 97% from 2015, representing approximately $30 billion in deployed capital, along with another $2.2 billion in U.S. manufactured PV products.

By 2016, the program achieved 90% of the progress towards the 2020 goal. In September 2017, it was announced that it had already reached its 2020 goal, and then shifted its focus on grid reliability.

== Goals and mission ==
When the program was first launched in 2011 it set a series of goals and cost targets:

Type	Cost target
Residential PV	$0.09 per kilowatt hour
Commercial PV	$0.07 per kilowatt hour
Utility-scale PV	$0.06 per kilowatt hour

In 2016, the SunShot Initiative announced new cost targets that it wanted to be achieved by the year 2030:

Type	Cost target
Residential PV	$0.05 per kilowatt hour
Commercial PV	$0.04 per kilowatt hour
Utility-scale PV	$0.03 per kilowatt hour

According to the program, "These cost targets inform the decisions SunShot makes to spur the country’s solar market and drive deployment of solar energy."

== Organization ==
The SunShot Initiative is divided into five subprograms:

- Photovoltaics - supports the early-stage research and development of photovoltaic (PV) technologies that improve efficiency and reliability, lower manufacturing costs, and drive down the cost of solar electricity.
- Concentrating Solar Power - supports the development of novel CSP technologies that will lower cost, increase efficiency, and improve reliability compared to current state-of-the-art technologies.
- Systems Integration - seeks to enable the widespread deployment of secure, reliable, and cost effective solar energy on the nation’s electricity grid by addressing the associated technical and organizational challenges.
- Soft Costs - addresses challenges associated with non-hardware costs of solar and remove market barriers to the adoption of solar energy technologies.
- Technology to Market - this subprogram investigates and validates groundbreaking, early-stage technology, software, and business models to strengthen early-stage concepts and move them toward readiness for greater private sector investment and scale-up to commercialization.

All subprograms issue competitive awards to universities, national laboratories, nonprofit organizations, solar companies, and state and local governments to fund research and development projects that will aid in lowering the cost of electricity generated from solar technology.

Below is a spending breakdown of the Soft Costs program for fiscal year 2015:

Purpose	Cost
Solar research at National Laboratories	$5,800,000
Pilot programs for solar incentives/subsidies	$17,400,000
Education training	$8,000,000
Studying solar panel deployment on federal lands	$6,000,000
Studies on streamlining solar data to “increase access to financing"	$5,000,000
Using students to develop plans for local government policies that help solar	$2,000,000
