= Nanocrystalline silicon =

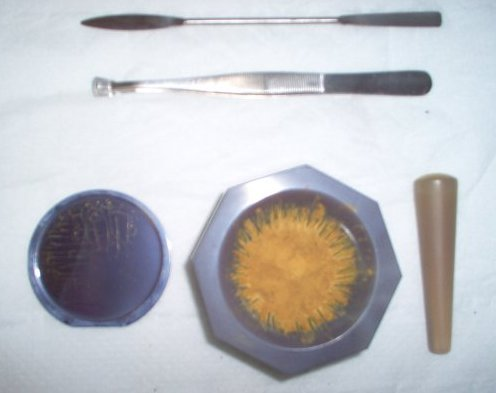
Silicon nanopowder

Nanocrystalline silicon (nc-Si), sometimes also known as microcrystalline silicon (μc-Si), is a form of porous silicon. It is an allotropic form of silicon with paracrystalline structure—is similar to amorphous silicon (a-Si), in that it has an amorphous phase. Where they differ, however, is that nc-Si has small grains of crystalline silicon within the amorphous phase. This is in contrast to polycrystalline silicon (poly-Si) which consists solely of crystalline silicon grains, separated by grain boundaries. The difference comes solely from the grain size of the crystalline grains. Most materials with grains in the micrometre range are actually fine-grained polysilicon, so nanocrystalline silicon is a better term. The term Nanocrystalline silicon refers to a range of materials around the transition region from amorphous to microcrystalline phase in the silicon thin film. The crystalline volume fraction (as measured from Raman spectroscopy) is another criterion to describe the materials in this transition zone.

nc-Si has many useful advantages over a-Si, one being that if grown properly it can have a higher electron mobility, due to the presence of the silicon crystallites. It also shows increased absorption in the red and infrared wavelengths, which make it an important material for use in a-Si solar cells. One of the most important advantages of nanocrystalline silicon, however, is that it has increased stability over a-Si, one of the reasons being because of its lower hydrogen concentration. Although it currently cannot attain the mobility that poly-Si can, it has the advantage over poly-Si that it is easier to fabricate, as it can be deposited using conventional low temperature a-Si deposition techniques, such as PECVD, as opposed to laser annealing or high temperature CVD processes, in the case of poly-Si.

== Uses ==
The main application of this novel material is in the field of silicon thin film solar cells. As nc-Si has about the same bandgap as crystalline silicon, which is ~1.12 eV, it can be combined in thin layers with a-Si, creating a layered, multi-junction cell called a tandem cell. The top cell in a-Si absorbs the visible light and leaves the infrared part of the spectrum for the bottom cell in nanocrystalline Si.

A few companies are on the verge of commercializing silicon inks based on nanocrystalline silicon or on other silicon compounds. The semiconductor industry is also investigating the potential for nanocrystalline silicon, especially in the memory area.

== Thin-film silicon ==
Nanocrystalline silicon and small-grained polycrystalline silicon are considered thin-film silicon.

== See also ==
- Amorphous silicon
- Conductive ink
- Nanoparticle
- Printed electronics
- Protocrystalline
- Quantum dot
