= Quantum dot solar cell =

Type of solar cell based on quantum dot devices

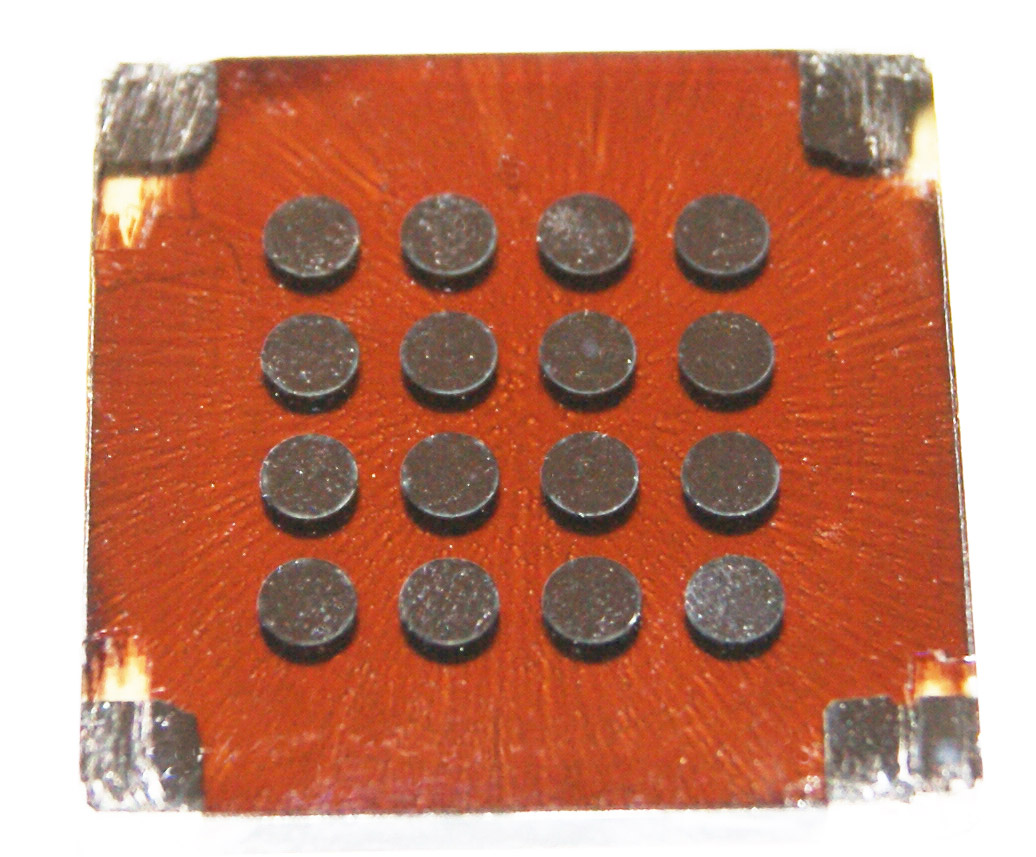
Spin-cast quantum dot solar cell built by the Sargent Group at the University of Toronto. The metal disks on the front surface are the electrical connections to the layers below.

A quantum dot solar cell (QDSC) is a solar cell design that uses quantum dots as the captivating photovoltaic material. It attempts to replace bulk materials such as silicon, copper indium gallium selenide (CIGS) or cadmium telluride (CdTe). Quantum dots have bandgaps that are adjustable across a wide range of energy levels by changing their size. In bulk materials, the bandgap is fixed by the choice of material(s). This property makes quantum dots attractive for multi-junction solar cells, where a variety of materials are used to improve efficiency by harvesting multiple portions of the solar spectrum.

As of 2022, efficiency exceeds 18.1%. Quantum dot solar cells have the potential to increase the maximum attainable thermodynamic conversion efficiency of solar photon conversion up to about 66% by utilizing hot photogenerated carriers to produce higher photovoltages or higher photocurrents.

Typical quantum dots solar cells consist of a glass substrate followed by a transparent electrically conducting indium tin oxide(ITO) that allows light to penetrate the solar cell. It also contains a conducting polymer, poly(3,4-ethylenedioxythiophene) polystyrene sulfonate (PEDOT:PSS), to enroll as electron blocker and hole injector to the ITO layer. Finally, quantum dots(QDs) such as cadmium selenide along with poly(3-hexylthiophene) (P3HT) are used between the metal cathode and the conductive polymer layer to ensure optimal function.

== Background ==
In a conventional solar cell light is absorbed by a semiconductor, producing an electron-hole (e-h) pair; the pair may be bound and is referred to as an exciton. This pair is separated by an internal electrochemical potential (present in p-n junctions or Schottky diodes) and the resulting flow of electrons and holes creates an electric current. The internal electrochemical potential is created by doping one part of the semiconductor interface with atoms that act as electron donors (n-type doping) and another with electron acceptors (p-type doping) that results in a p-n junction. The generation of an e-h pair requires that the photons have energy exceeding the bandgap of the material. Effectively, photons with energies lower than the bandgap do not get absorbed, while those that are higher can quickly (within about 10^{−13} s) thermalize to the band edges, reducing output. The former limitation reduces current, while the thermalization reduces the voltage. As a result, semiconductor cells suffer a trade-off between voltage and current (which can be in part alleviated by using multiple junction implementations). The detailed balance calculation shows that this efficiency can not exceed 33% if one uses a single material with an ideal bandgap of 1.34 eV for a solar cell.

The band gap (1.34 eV) of an ideal single-junction cell is close to that of silicon (1.1 eV), one of the many reasons that silicon dominates the market. However, silicon's efficiency is limited to about 30% (Shockley–Queisser limit). It is possible to improve on a single-junction cell by vertically stacking cells with different bandgaps – termed a "tandem" or "multi-junction" approach. The same analysis shows that a two layer cell should have one layer tuned to 1.64 eV and the other to 0.94 eV, providing a theoretical performance of 44%. A three-layer cell should be tuned to 1.83, 1.16 and 0.71 eV, with an efficiency of 48%. An "infinity-layer" cell would have a theoretical efficiency of 86%, with other thermodynamic loss mechanisms accounting for the rest.

Traditional (crystalline) silicon preparation methods do not lend themselves to this approach due to lack of bandgap tunability. Thin-films of amorphous silicon, which due to a relaxed requirement in crystal momentum preservation can achieve direct bandgaps and intermixing of carbon, can tune the bandgap, but other issues have prevented these from matching the performance of traditional cells. Most tandem-cell structures are based on higher performance semiconductors, notably indium gallium arsenide (InGaAs). Three-layer InGaAs/GaAs/InGaP cells (bandgaps 0.94/1.42/1.89 eV) hold the efficiency record of 42.3% for experimental examples.

However, the QDSCs suffer from weak absorption and the contribution of the light absorption at room temperature is marginal. This can be addressed by utilizing multibranched Au nanostars.

=== Quantum dots ===
Quantum dots are semiconducting particles that have been reduced below the size of the exciton Bohr radius and due to quantum mechanics considerations, the electron energies that can exist within them become finite, much alike energies in an atom. Quantum dots have been referred to as "artificial atoms". These energy levels are tuneable by changing their size, which in turn defines the bandgap. The dots can be grown over a range of sizes, allowing them to express a variety of bandgaps without changing the underlying material or construction techniques. In typical wet chemistry preparations, the tuning is accomplished by varying the synthesis duration or temperature.

The ability to tune the bandgap makes quantum dots desirable for solar cells. For the sun's photon distribution spectrum, the Shockley-Queisser limit indicates that the maximum solar conversion efficiency occurs in a material with a band gap of 1.34 eV. However, materials with lower band gaps will be better suited to generate electricity from lower-energy photons (and vice versa). Single junction implementations using lead sulfide (PbS) colloidal quantum dots (CQD) have bandgaps that can be tuned into the far infrared, frequencies that are typically difficult to achieve with traditional solar cells. Half of the solar energy reaching the Earth is in the infrared, most in the near infrared region. A quantum dot solar cell makes infrared energy as accessible as any other.

Moreover, CQD offer easy synthesis and preparation. While suspended in a colloidal liquid form they can be easily handled throughout production, with a fumehood as the most complex equipment needed. CQD are typically synthesized in small batches, but can be mass-produced. The dots can be distributed on a substrate by spin coating, either by hand or in an automated process. Large-scale production could use spray-on or roll-printing systems, dramatically reducing module construction costs.

== Principles of Quantum Dot Solar Cells ==
Quantum dots solar cells' operational mechanism can be explained by the understanding of the concept of intermediate band solar cell(IBSC). Quantum dots have an intermediate energy band between the valence and conduction band of the host materials. This unique quantum-scale phenomena unlocks two main processes that permit the cell's functionality.

First, the presence of an intermediate band enables a two step photonic transition that makes it possible for the absorption of sub-bandgap photons, broadening the light absorption that is often missed in regular solar cells. Secondly, it has the potential to exceed the Shockley-Queisser efficiency limit of single-junction solar cells, promising a new frontier in photovoltaic technology.

== Synthesis and Preparation ==
Early examples used costly molecular beam epitaxy processes. However, the lattice mismatch results in accumulation of strain and thus generation of defects, restricting the number of stacked layers. Droplet epitaxy growth technique shows its advantages on the fabrication of strain-free QDs. Alternatively, less expensive fabrication methods were later developed. These use wet chemistry (for CQD) and subsequent solution processing. Concentrated nanoparticle solutions are stabilized by long hydrocarbon ligands that keep the nanocrystals suspended in solution.

To create a solid, these solutions are cast down and the long stabilizing ligands are replaced with short-chain crosslinkers. Chemically engineering the nanocrystal surface can better passivate the nanocrystals and reduce detrimental trap states that would curtail device performance by means of carrier recombination. This approach produces an efficiency of 7.0%.

A more recent study uses different ligands for different functions by tuning their relative band alignment to improve the performance to 8.6%. The cells were solution-processed in air at room-temperature and exhibited air-stability for more than 150 days without encapsulation.

In 2014 the use of iodide as a ligand that does not bond to oxygen was introduced. This maintains stable n- and p-type layers, boosting the absorption efficiency, which produced power conversion efficiency up to 8%.

== Technological Advancements ==
The idea of using quantum dots as a path to high efficiency was first noted by Barnham and Duggan in 1989. At the time, the science of quantum dots, or "wells" as they were known, was in its infancy and early examples were just becoming available.

=== DSSC efforts ===
Another modern cell design is the dye-sensitized solar cell, or DSSC. DSSCs use a sponge-like layer of TiO_{2} as the semiconductor valve as well as a mechanical support structure. During construction, the sponge is filled with an organic dye, typically ruthenium-polypyridine, which injects electrons into the titanium dioxide upon photoexcitation. This dye is relatively expensive, and ruthenium is a rare metal.

Using quantum dots as an alternative to molecular dyes was considered from the earliest days of DSSC research. The ability to tune the bandgap allowed the designer to select a wider variety of materials for other portions of the cell. Collaborating groups from the University of Toronto and École Polytechnique Fédérale de Lausanne developed a design based on a rear electrode directly in contact with a film of quantum dots, eliminating the electrolyte and forming a depleted heterojunction. These cells reached 7.0% efficiency, better than the best solid-state DSSC devices, but below those based on liquid electrolytes.

=== Multi-junction ===
Traditionally, multi-junction solar cells are made with a collection of multiple semiconductor materials. Because each material has a different band gap, each material's p-n junction will be optimized for a different incoming wavelength of light. Using multiple materials enables the absorbance of a broader range of wavelengths, which increases the cell's electrical conversion efficiency.

However, the use of multiple materials makes multi-junction solar cells too expensive for many commercial uses. Because the band gap of quantum dots can be tuned by adjusting the particle radius, multi-junction cells can be manufactured by incorporating quantum dot semiconductors of different sizes (and therefore different band gaps). Using the same material lowers manufacturing costs, and the enhanced absorption spectrum of quantum dots can be used to increase the short-circuit current and overall cell efficiency.

Cadmium telluride (CdTe) is used for cells that absorb multiple frequencies. A colloidal suspension of these crystals is spin-cast onto a substrate such as a thin glass slide, potted in a conductive polymer. These cells did not use quantum dots, but shared features with them, such as spin-casting and the use of a thin film conductor. At low production scales quantum dots are more expensive than mass-produced nanocrystals, but cadmium and telluride are rare and highly toxic metals subject to price swings.

The Sargent Group used lead sulfide as an infrared-sensitive electron donor to produce then record-efficiency IR solar cells. Spin-casting may allow the construction of "tandem" cells at greatly reduced cost. The original cells used a gold substrate as an electrode, although nickel works just as well.

=== Hot-carrier capture ===
Another way to improve efficiency is to capture the extra energy in the electron when emitted from a single-bandgap material. In traditional materials like silicon, the distance from the emission site to the electrode where they are harvested is too far to allow this to occur; the electron will undergo many interactions with the crystal materials and lattice, giving up this extra energy as heat. Amorphous thin-film silicon was tried as an alternative, but the defects inherent to these materials overwhelmed their potential advantage. Modern thin-film cells remain generally less efficient than traditional silicon.

Nanostructured donors can be cast as uniform films that avoid the problems with defects. These would be subject to other issues inherent to quantum dots, notably resistivity issues and heat retention.

=== Multiple excitons ===
The Shockley-Queisser limit, which sets the maximum efficiency of a single-layer photovoltaic cell to be 33.7%, assumes that only one electron-hole pair (exciton) can be generated per incoming photon. Multiple exciton generation (MEG) is an exciton relaxation pathway which allows two or more excitons to be generated per incoming high energy photon. In traditional photovoltaics, this excess energy is lost to the bulk material as lattice vibrations (electron-phonon coupling). MEG occurs when this excess energy is transferred to excite additional electrons across the band gap, where they can contribute to the short-circuit current density.

Within quantum dots, quantum confinement increases coulombic interactions which drives the MEG process. This phenomenon also decreases the rate of electron-phonon coupling, which is the dominant method of exciton relaxation in bulk semiconductors. The phonon bottleneck slows the rate of hot carrier cooling, which allows excitons to pursue other pathways of relaxation; this allows MEG to dominate in quantum dot solar cells. The rate of MEG can be optimized by tailoring quantum dot ligand chemistry, as well as by changing the quantum dot material and geometry.

In 2004, Los Alamos National Laboratory reported spectroscopic evidence that several excitons could be efficiently generated upon absorption of a single, energetic photon in a quantum dot. Capturing them would catch more of the energy in sunlight. In this approach, known as "carrier multiplication" (CM) or "multiple exciton generation" (MEG), the quantum dot is tuned to release multiple electron-hole pairs at a lower energy instead of one pair at high energy. This increases efficiency through increased photocurrent. LANL's dots were made from lead selenide.

In 2010, the University of Wyoming demonstrated similar performance using DCCS cells. Lead-sulfur (PbS) dots demonstrated two-electron ejection when the incoming photons had about three times the bandgap energy.

In 2005, NREL demonstrated MEG in quantum dots, producing three electrons per photon and a theoretical efficiency of 65%. In 2007, they achieved a similar result in silicon.

=== Non-oxidizing ===
In 2014 a University of Toronto group manufactured and demonstrated a type of CQD n-type cell using PbS with special treatment so that it doesn't bind with oxygen. The cell achieved 8% efficiency, just shy of the current QD efficiency record. Such cells create the possibility of uncoated "spray-on" cells. However, these air-stable n-type CQD were actually fabricated in an oxygen-free environment.

Also in 2014, another research group at MIT demonstrated air-stable ZnO/PbS solar cells that were fabricated in air and achieved a certified 8.55% record efficiency (9.2% in lab) because they absorbed light well, while also transporting charge to collectors at the cell's edge. These cells show unprecedented air-stability for quantum dot solar cells that the performance remained unchanged for more than 150 days of storage in air.

== Quantum Dot Solar Cells Market ==
The quantum dot solar cells market has had considerably growth due to the efforts of finding new renewable energy sources, in 2024, the market size was valued at US$910.49 million, and it is projected to rise up to US$3,174.28 million for 2033 at a compound annual growth of rate of 15.4%. This motivates more research and development in the area.

=== Commercial Providers ===
Although quantum dot solar cells have yet to be commercially viable on the mass scale, several small commercial providers have begun marketing quantum dot photovoltaic products. Investors and financial analysts have identified quantum dot photovoltaics as a key future technology for the solar industry.

- Quantum Materials Corp. (QMC) and subsidiary Solterra Renewable Technologies are developing and manufacturing quantum dots and nanomaterials for use in solar energy and lighting applications. With their patented continuous flow production process for perovskite quantum dots, QMC hopes to lower the cost of quantum dot solar cell production in addition to applying their nanomaterials to other emerging industries.
- QD Solar takes advantage of the tunable band gap of quantum dots to create multi-junction solar cells. By combining efficient silicon solar cells with infrared solar cells made from quantum dots, QD Solar aims to harvest more of the solar spectrum. QD Solar's inorganic quantum dots are processed with high-throughput and cost-effective technologies and are more light- and air- stable than polymeric nanomaterials.
- UbiQD is developing photovoltaic windows using quantum dots as fluorophores. They have designed a luminescent solar concentrator (LSC) using near-infrared quantum dots which are cheaper and less toxic than traditional alternatives. UbiQD hopes to provide semi-transparent windows that convert passive buildings into energy generation units, while simultaneously reducing the heat gain of the building.
- ML System S.A., a BIPV producer listed on Warsaw Stock Exchange intends to start volume production of its QuantumGlass product between 2020 and 2021.

== Challenges for Quantum Dot Solar Cells ==
Despite the rapid rise of Quantum dot photovoltaic devices, from 1% in 2005 to 9.9% in 2015, there are still challenges that have to be overcame for the mass use of these technologies. One of the biggest challenges relies in material stability, commercially viable solar modules are expected to retain 90% of their initial PCE, major issue with QD is that around 50% of atoms are at the surface, this fact implies that the exposure of an n-type QD solid to oxygen can lead to surface modification and therefore affecting the conductivity significantly. Just as high temperatures can induce sintering in the material and there reducing the electronic characteristics.

Additionally, many heavy-metal quantum dot (lead/cadmium chalcogenides such as PbSe, CdSe) semiconductors can be cytotoxic and must be encapsulated in a stable polymer shell to prevent exposure. Non-toxic quantum dot materials such as AgBiS_{2} nanocrystals have been explored due to their safety and abundance; exploration with solar cells based with these materials have demonstrated comparable conversion efficiencies (> 9%) and short-circuit current densities (> 27 mA/cm^{2}). UbiQD's CuInSe_{2−X} quantum dot material is another example of a non-toxic semiconductor compound.

== See also ==
- Third-generation photovoltaic cell
- Nanocrystalline silicon
- Nanoparticle
- Photoelectrochemical cell
- Organic solar cell
