= Thermodynamic efficiency limit =

Maximum possible efficiency of electrical power from sunlight

The thermodynamic efficiency limit is the absolute maximum theoretically possible conversion efficiency of sunlight to electricity. Its value is about 86%, which is the Chambadal-Novikov efficiency, an approximation related to the Carnot limit, based on the temperature of the photons emitted by the Sun's surface.

== Effect of band gap energy ==
Solar cells operate as quantum energy conversion devices, and are therefore subject to the thermodynamic efficiency limit. Photons with an energy below the band gap of the absorber material cannot generate an electron-hole pair, and so their energy is not converted to useful output and only generates heat if absorbed. For photons with an energy above the band gap energy, only a fraction of the energy above the band gap can be converted to useful output. When a photon of greater energy is absorbed, the excess energy above the band gap is converted to kinetic energy of the carrier recombination. The excess kinetic energy is converted to heat through phonon interactions as the kinetic energy of the carriers slows to equilibrium velocity. Hence, the solar energy cannot be converted to electricity beyond a certain limit.

Solar cells with multiple band gap absorber materials improve efficiency by dividing the solar spectrum into smaller bins where the thermodynamic efficiency limit is higher for each bin. The thermodynamic limits of such cells (also called multi-junction cells, or tandem cells) can be analyzed using and online simulator in nanoHUB.

== Efficiency limits for different solar cell technologies ==
Thermodynamic efficiency limits for different solar cell technologies are as follows:

- Single junctions ≈ 33%
- 3-cell stacks and impure PVs ≈ 50%
- Hot carrier- or impact ionization-based devices ≈ 54-68%
- Commercial modules are ≈ 12-21%
- Solar cell with an upconverter for operation in the AM1.5 spectrum and with a 2eV bandgap ≈ 50.7%

== Thermodynamic efficiency limit for excitonic solar cells ==
The Shockley-Queisser limit for the efficiency of a single-junction solar cell under unconcentrated sunlight. This calculated curve uses actual solar spectrum data, and therefore the curve is wiggly from IR absorption bands in the atmosphere. This efficiency limit of about 34% can be exceeded by multijunction solar cells.

Excitonic solar cells generates free charge by bound and intermediate exciton states unlike inorganic and crystalline solar cells. The efficiency of the excitonic solar cells and inorganic solar cells (with less exciton-binding energy) cannot go beyond 31% as explained by Shockley and Queisser.

== Thermodynamic efficiency limits with carrier multiplication ==
Carrier multiplication facilitates multiple electron-hole pair generation for each photon absorbed. Efficiency limits for photovoltaic cells can be theoretically higher considering thermodynamic effects. For a solar cell powered by the Sun's unconcentrated black-body radiation, the theoretical maximum efficiency is 43% whereas for a solar cell powered by the Sun's full concentrated radiation, the efficiency limit is up to 85%. These high values of efficiencies are possible only when the solar cells use radiative recombination and carrier multiplication.

== See also ==
- Quantum efficiency of a solar cell
- Energy conversion efficiency
- Photoelectric effect
- Solar cell efficiency
