= Third-generation photovoltaic cell =

Third-generation photovoltaic cells are solar cells that are potentially able to overcome the Shockley–Queisser limit of 31–41% power efficiency for single bandgap solar cells. This includes a range of alternatives to cells made of semiconducting p–n junctions ("first generation") and thin-film cells ("second generation"). Common third-generation systems include multi-layer ("tandem") cells made of amorphous silicon or gallium arsenide, while more theoretical developments include frequency conversion, (i.e. changing the frequencies of light that the cell cannot use to light frequencies that the cell can use – thus producing more power), hot-carrier effects and other multiple-carrier ejection techniques.

Emerging photovoltaics include:

- Copper zinc tin sulfide solar cell (CZTS), and derivates CZTSe and CZTSSe
- Dye-sensitized solar cell, also known as "Grätzel cell"
- Organic solar cell
- Perovskite solar cell
- Quantum dot solar cell

Perovskite cells, in particular, have received attention as their research efficiencies rose above 20 percent. They also offer a wide variety of low-cost applications. In addition, another emerging technology, concentrator photovoltaics (CPV), uses high-efficient, multi-junction solar cells in combination with optical lenses and a tracking system.

== Technologies ==
Solar cells can be thought of as visible light counterparts to radio receivers. A receiver consists of three basic parts; an antenna that converts the radio waves (light) into wave-like motions of electrons in the antenna material, an electronic valve that traps the electrons as they pop off the end of the antenna, and a tuner that amplifies electrons of a selected frequency. It is possible to build a solar cell identical to a radio, a system known as an optical rectenna, but to date these have not been practical.

The majority of the solar electric market is made up of silicon-based devices. In silicon cells, the silicon acts as both the antenna (or electron donor, technically) as well as the electron valve. Silicon is widely available, relatively inexpensive and has a bandgap that is ideal for solar collection. On the downside it is energetically and economically expensive to produce silicon in bulk, and great efforts have been made to reduce the amount required. Moreover, it is mechanically fragile, which typically requires a sheet of strong glass to be used as mechanical support and protection from the elements. The glass alone is a significant portion of the cost of a typical solar module.

According to the Shockley–Queisser limit, the majority of a cell's theoretical efficiency is due to the difference in energy between the bandgap and solar photon. Any photon with more energy than the bandgap can cause photoexcitation, but any energy above the bandgap energy is lost. Consider the solar spectrum; only a small portion of the light reaching the ground is blue, but those photons have three times the energy of red light. Silicon's bandgap is 1.1 eV, about that of red light, so in this case blue light's energy is lost in a silicon cell. If the bandgap is tuned higher, say to blue, that energy is now captured, but only at the cost of rejecting lower energy photons.

It is possible to greatly improve on a single-junction cell by stacking thin layers of material with varying bandgaps on top of each other – the "tandem cell" or "multi-junction" approach. Traditional silicon preparation methods do not lend themselves to this approach. Thin-films of amorphous silicon have been employed instead, notably Uni-Solar's products, but other issues have prevented these from matching the performance of traditional cells. Most tandem-cell structures are based on higher performance semiconductors, notably gallium arsenide (GaAs). Three-layer GaAs cells achieved 41.6% efficiency for experimental examples. In September 2013, a four layer cell reached 44.7 percent efficiency.

Numerical analysis shows that the "perfect" single-layer solar cell should have a bandgap of 1.13 eV, almost exactly that of silicon. Such a cell can have a maximum theoretical power conversion efficiency of 33.7% – the solar power below red (in the infrared) is lost, and the extra energy of the higher colors is also lost. For a two layer cell, one layer should be tuned to 1.64 eV and the other at 0.94 eV, with a theoretical performance of 44%. A three-layer cell should be tuned to 1.83, 1.16 and 0.71 eV, with an efficiency of 48%. A theoretical "infinity-layer" cell would have a theoretical efficiency of 68.2% for diffuse light.

While the new solar technologies that have been discovered center around nanotechnology, there are several different material methods currently used.

The third generation label encompasses multiple technologies, though it includes non-semiconductor technologies (including polymers and biomimetics), quantum dot, tandem/multi-junction cells, intermediate band solar cell, hot-carrier cells, photon upconversion and downconversion technologies, and solar thermal technologies, such as thermophotonics, which is one technology identified by Green as being third generation.

It also includes:

- Silicon nanostructures
- Modifying incident spectrum (concentrator photovoltaics), to reach 300–500 suns and efficiencies of 32% (already attained in Sol3g cells) to +50%.
- Use of excess thermal generation (caused by UV light) to enhance voltages or carrier collection.
- Use of infrared spectrum to produce electricity at night.

== See also ==
- Band gap
- Nanoantenna
- Organic electronics
- Printed electronics
