= Metamorphic solar cells =

Type of multi-junction solar cell

Metamorphic (MM) solar cells, also called lattice-mismatched solar cells, are multi-junction solar cells that incorporate materials with different lattice constants. These are contrasted with lattice-matched solar cells in which all subcells have the same lattice constant. Metamorphic solar cells are monolithic, meaning the subcells are grown on the same substrate. A variety of MM cell is the inverted metamorphic (IMM) cell, featuring an inverted growth sequence. The term upright metamorphic (UMM) cell can also be used for metamorphic cells that aren't inverted.

The main advantage of MM cells is the ability to optimize the band gaps of each subcell for maximum efficiency, a process known as band-gap engineering. Although band gaps can be modified in all multijunction solar cells, metamorphic semiconductors allow for greatly increased flexibility. Because of their high efficiency and low thickness, IMM cells in particular have high-potential for space use.

== Background ==
A multi-junction solar cell features solar cells with different band gaps layered on top of each other. They are arranged such that light reaches the wider band gap cells first, with narrower band gaps underneath. This allows for the device to utilize a broader portion of the solar spectrum, resulting in a greatly increased solar cell efficiency compared to traditional cells. In order to achieve this, materials with suitable band gaps are required. A key constraint of conventional multi-junction design is matching the lattice constants. A mismatch of as little as ±0.01% can notably reduce the quality of a cell.

== Design ==
By using metamorphic, or lattice-mismatched, materials, multi-junction solar cells with more optimal band gaps can be constructed. Theoretically, such a method could allow for efficiencies beyond even the best lattice-matched cells. However, having different lattice constants causes elastic deformation. The strain can be relaxed, but dislocations will form as a result. If dislocations spread to active cell layers, the nonradiative recombination rate will increase. This in turn decreases the voltage of the cell and reduces performance.

Diagram demonstrating the fabrication process of a triple-junction solar cell using UMM (left) and IMM (right) methods

A graded buffer layer is used to relieve strain and reduce dislocations; it acts as a transition between different lattice constants and prevents dislocations from spreading. Buffer layers can be either step-graded or compositionally graded. Compositionally graded buffers gradually change layers while step-graded buffers change the composition at discrete points. With the dislocations sufficiently managed, the advantages of the modified band gaps outweigh the disadvantages of a mismatch.

A variation of this method has the higher band gap subcells grown first, with the lattice-mismatched subcells being grown after. Such cells are known as inverted metamorphic cells. This necessitates that the substrate is removed, which is done through either etching or epitaxial lift-off. Metamorphic cells that aren't inverted are sometimes referred to as upright metamorphic cells.

== Considerations ==
III-V multi-junction solar cells, including metamorphic solar cells, showcase higher efficiency and durability compared to traditional silicon cells. The downside is that they have a significantly higher cost and a more complex fabriciation process. This has resulted in them being used in space where low mass is prioritized, but not as much in the terrestrial market where cost-efficiency is critical.

The subcells of a monolithic multi-junction solar cell are connected in series; this causes the output current to be limited by the subcell that generates the lowest photocurrent. Therefore, maximizing efficiency requires current matching between the subcells. Achieving this necessitates precise tuning of the band gaps and layer thicknesses, as the photocurrent is proportional to the absorption coefficient of the material and the amount of incident photons with energy beyond the band gap.

In an UMM solar cell, all the subcells are grown after the change in lattice constant. This means that each layer is affected by any decrease in quality, limiting the possible amount of lattice mismatch. With IMM cells, the layers with higher mismatch are grown last, resulting in more potential mismatch while minimizing the dislocations in the top subcell. This allows for the replacement of the traditional germanium bottom junction with better current-matched materials, such as gallium indium arsenide.

Using the IMM method decreases the required quality of the buffer layer. Additionally, the process of removing the substrate in an IMM cell reduces the weight and increases the power-to-mass ratio while making the cell thinner and more flexible. This also means that IMM designs are compatible with thin-film solar cells, allowing for minimal optical losses from thickness reduction.

== Usage ==
Metamorphic techniques have been used in multiple solar cells with world record efficiency. In 2008, researchers at the National Renewable Energy Laboratory (NREL) set the then world record for III-V multijunction cell efficiency using an IMM solar cell with 40.8% efficiency under concentration. The previous record of 40.7% efficiency was achieved with a UMM solar cell; this was the first cell with 40% efficiency. In 2020, researchers at the NREL demonstrated 47.1% efficiency with a six-junction IMM cell.

When it comes to the application of solar cells in space, efficiency and radiation resistance are critical. This aligns well with the properties of IMM solar cells. IMM solar cells have been used in the Ingenuity helicopter and the Airbus Zephyr.

== See also ==
- Solar cell research
