= Hans-Joachim Queisser =

German solid state physicist (1931–2025)

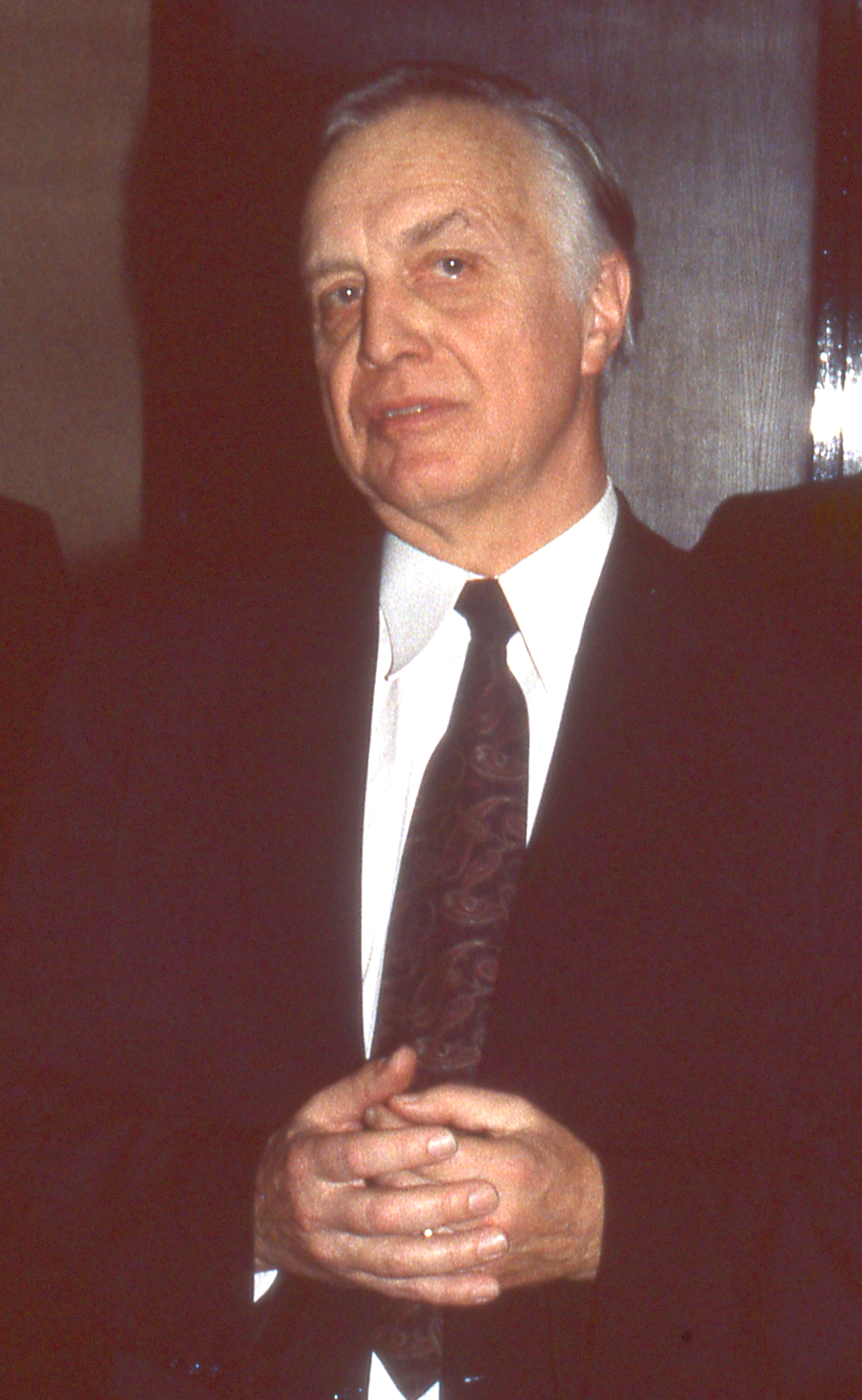
- Queisser in 1995
- Born: 6 July 1931; Berlin, Brandenburg, Prussia, Germany
- Died: 27 June 2025 (aged 93)
- Education: University of Berlin; University of Kansas; University of Göttingen
- Known for: Shockley–Queisser limit
- Scientific career
- Institutions: Shockley Transistor Corporation; University of Frankfurt; Max Planck Institute for Solid State Research
- Doctoral advisor: Rudolf Hilsch
- Doctoral students: Horst Ludwig Störmer; Karl Leo

Hans-Joachim Queisser (6 July 1931 – 27 June 2025) was a German solid-state physicist. He was best known for co-authoring the 1961 work on solar cells that detailed what is today known as the Shockley–Queisser limit, now considered the key contribution in this field.

== Education and career ==
Queisser was born in Berlin and his father was a mechanical engineer for Siemens. In 1928, he travelled to the United States to work on power plants and asked his fiancée to join him. She wanted to return to Germany, and Hans Joachim was born shortly after their return in 1931, in Berlin. He was in Dresden during the air raid in 1945 and states that he survived "barely". His father was sent to the Soviet Union after the war, and Queisser wanted to enter the University of Berlin through an apprenticeship program and work as a technician at a research institute in Berlin. However, he instead applied for a scholarship in the United States and was accepted to the University of Kansas in 1951 and 1952. He returned to Germany and obtained his Ph.D. in physics at the University of Göttingen in 1958 under the supervision of Rudolf Hilsch.

After graduating in Göttingen, Queisser accepted a job at the Shockley Transistor Corporation in Mountain View, California, where he worked on crystal growth, epitaxy, diffusion, lattice defects, junction properties and solar cells. During this time, he and Shockley calculated the maximal theoretical efficiency of silicon solar cells to be around 31%. He and his co-worker Richard Finch identified oxygen-induced stacking faults and achieved the first transmission electron microscopy on semiconductors with J. Washburn and G. Thomas at UC Berkeley.

Queisser left Shockley for Bell Labs in 1964, working on gallium arsenide for optoelectronics. During this time, he invented a high-power luminescent diode, an infrared light emitting diode (LED) that now forms the basis of almost every household remote control device. Modifications of the basic design represent practically every LED in existence today. In 1966, he left Bell to become a professor at the University of Frankfurt. In 1970, he became a founding director of the Max Planck Institute for Solid State Research at Stuttgart. He served in this role until his retirement in 1998.

== Death ==
Queisser died on 27 June 2025, at the age of 93.

== Honours and awards ==
Queisser became a member of the German Academy of Sciences Leopoldina in 1994. He was a Fellow of the American Physical Society. He was president of the German Physical Society between 1976 and 1977.
