= Multiple exciton generation =

Concept in quantum electronics

Breakdown of the causes for the Shockley-Queisser limit. The black height is Shockley-Queisser limit for the maximum energy that can be extracted as useful electrical power in a conventional solar cell. However, a multiple-exciton-generation solar cell can also use some of the energy in the green area (and to a lesser extent the blue area), rather than wasting it as heat. Therefore it can theoretically exceed the Shockley-Queisser limit.

In solar cell research, carrier multiplication is the phenomenon wherein the absorption of a single photon leads to the excitation of multiple electrons from the valence band to conduction band. In the theory of a conventional solar cell, each photon is only able to excite one electron across the band gap of the semiconductor, and any excess energy in that photon is dissipated as heat. In a material with carrier multiplication, high-energy photons excite on average more than one electron across the band gap, and so in principle the solar cell can produce more useful work.

In quantum dot solar cells, the excited electron in the conduction band interacts with the hole it leaves behind in the valence band, and this composite uncharged object is known as an exciton. The carrier multiplication effect in a dot can be understood as creating multiple excitons, and is called multiple exciton generation (MEG). MEG may considerably increase the energy conversion efficiency of nanocrystal-based solar cells, though extracting the energy may be difficult because of the short lifetimes of the multiexcitons.

The quantum mechanical origin of MEG is still under debate and several possibilities have been suggested:

- 1) Impact ionization: light excites a high-energy exciton (X) which decays irreversibly into a quasi-continuum of multiexciton (multi-X) states available at this energy. The model requires only the density of states of multiexcitons being very high, while the Coulomb coupling between X and multi-X can be quite small.
- 2) Coherent superposition of single and multiexciton states: the very first suggested model but oversimplified (high density of states of multi-X is not taken into account). Light excites an X (which is not a true eigenstate of the system) which can then coherently convert to multi-X and back to X many times (quantum beats). This process requires Coulomb coupling between them to be much stronger than the decay rate via phonons (which is usually not the case). The excitation will finally decay via phonons to a lower energy X or multi-X, depending on which of the decays is faster.
- 3) Multiexciton formation through a virtual exciton state. Light directly excites the eigenstate of the system (in this case, a coherent mixture of X and multi-X). The term "virtual" relates here to a pure X, because it is not a true eigenstate of the system (same for model 2).

All of the above models can be described by the same mathematical model (density matrix) which can behave differently depending on the set of initial parameters (coupling strength between the X and multi-X, density of states, decay rates).

MEG was first observed in 2004 using colloidal PbSe quantum dots and later was found in quantum dots of other compositions including PbS, PbTe, CdS, CdSe, InAs, Si, and InP. However, many early studies in colloidal quantum dots significantly overestimated the MEG effect due to undetected photocharging, an issue later identified and resolved by vigorously stirring colloidal samples. Multiple exciton generation was first demonstrated in a functioning solar cell in 2011, also using colloidal PbSe quantum dots. Multiple exciton generation was also detected in semiconducting single-walled carbon nanotubes (SWNTs) upon absorption of single photons. For (6,5) SWNTs, absorption of single photons with energies corresponding to three times the SWNT energy gap results in an exciton generation efficiency of 130% per photon. The multiple exciton generation threshold in SWNTs can be close to the limit defined by energy conservation.

Graphene, which is closely related to nanotubes, is another material in which multiple exciton generation has been observed.

Double-exciton generation has additionally been observed in organic pentacene derivatives through singlet exciton fission with extremely high quantum efficiency.
