= Open-circuit voltage =

Concept in circuit analysis

Definition of open-circuit voltage. The box is any two-terminal device, such as a battery or solar cell. The two terminals are not connected to anything (an open circuit), so no current can flow into or out of either terminal. The voltage v_{oc} between the terminals is the open-circuit voltage of the device.

Black curve: The highest possible open-circuit voltage of a solar cell in the Shockley–Queisser model under unconcentrated sunlight, as a function of the semiconductor band gap. The red dotted line shows that this voltage is always smaller than the band gap voltage.

Open-circuit voltage (OCV or V_{OC}) is the difference of electrical potential between two terminals of an electronic device when disconnected from any circuit.

== Voltage ==
There is no external load connected. No external electric current flows between the terminals. Alternatively, the open-circuit voltage may be thought of as the voltage that must be applied to a solar cell or a battery to stop the current. It is sometimes given the symbol V_{oc}. In network analysis this voltage is also known as the Thévenin voltage.

The open-circuit voltages of batteries and solar cells are often quoted under particular conditions (state-of-charge, illumination, temperature, etc.).

The potential difference mentioned for batteries and cells is usually the open-circuit voltage.

The value of the open-circuit voltage of a transducer equals its electromotive force (emf), which is the maximum potential difference it can produce when not providing current.

== Example ==
Consider the circuit:

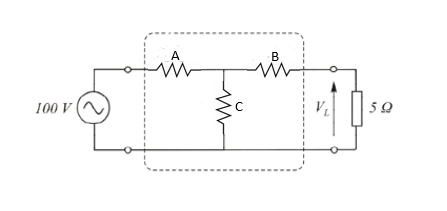
Given Circuit

If we want to find the open-circuit voltage across the 5Ω resistor, first disconnect it from the circuit:

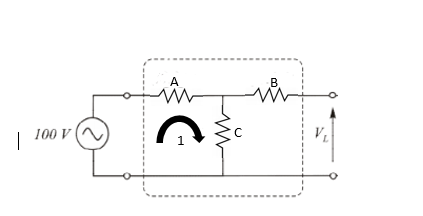
Modified circuit

Find the equivalent resistance in loop 1 to find the current in loop 1. Use Ohm's law with that current to find the potential drop across the resistance C. Note that since no current is flowing through resistor B, there is no potential drop across it, so it does not affect the open-circuit voltage.

The open-circuit voltage is the potential drop across the resistance C, which is: $\frac{C}{C+A}\ 100\ V_\sim\ .$

This is just an example. Many other ways can be used.

== See also ==
- Short circuit
