= Growth of photovoltaics =

Worldwide growth of photovoltaics

Benefitting from favorable policies and declining costs of modules, photovoltaic solar installation has grown consistently. In 2023, China added 60% of the world's new capacity.

Starting in 1992, the worldwide usage of photovoltaics (PV) increased exponentially. During this period, it evolved from a niche market of small-scale applications to a mainstream electricity source. From 2016 to 2022, PV has seen an annual capacity and production growth rate of around 26%, doubling approximately every three years.

When solar PV systems were first recognized as a promising renewable energy technology, subsidy programs, such as feed-in tariffs, were implemented by a number of governments in order to provide economic incentives for investments. For several years, growth was mainly driven by Japan and pioneering European countries. As a consequence, cost of solar declined significantly due to experience curve effects like improvements in technology and economies of scale. Several national programs were instrumental in increasing PV deployment, such as the Energiewende in Germany, the Million Solar Roofs project in the United States, and China's 2011 five-year-plan for energy production. Since then, deployment of photovoltaics has gained momentum on a worldwide scale, increasingly competing with conventional energy sources. In the early 21st century a market for utility-scale plants emerged to complement rooftop and other distributed applications. By 2015, some 30 countries had reached grid parity.

Since the 1950s, when the first solar cells were commercially manufactured, there has been a succession of countries leading the world as the largest producer of electricity from solar photovoltaics. First it was the United States, then Japan, followed by Germany, and currently China.

By the end of 2024, the global cumulative installed PV capacity reached about 2,260 gigawatts (GW), supplying 6.9% of global electricity demand, up from about 3% in 2019. In 2022, solar PV contributed over 10% of the annual domestic consumption of electricity in nine countries, with Spain, Greece and Chile over 17%.

Official agencies publish predictions of solar growth, often underestimating it. The International Energy Agency (IEA) have consistently increased their estimates for decades, while still falling far short of projecting actual deployment in every forecast. Bloomberg NEF projects an additional 600 GW coming online by 2030 in the United States.

== Solar PV nameplate capacity ==
Nameplate capacity denotes the peak power output of power stations in unit watt prefixed as convenient, to e.g. kilowatt (kW), megawatt (MW) and gigawatt (GW). Because power output for renewable sources is variable, a source's average generation is generally significantly lower than the nameplate capacity. In order to have an estimate of the average power output, the capacity can be multiplied by a suitable capacity factor, which takes into account varying conditions - weather, nighttime, latitude, maintenance. Worldwide, the average solar PV capacity factor is 11%. In addition, depending on context, the stated peak power may be prior to a subsequent conversion to alternating current, e.g. for a single photovoltaic panel, or include this conversion and its loss for a grid connected photovoltaic power station.

Wind power has different characteristics, e.g. a higher capacity factor and about four times the 2015 electricity production of solar power. Compared with wind power, photovoltaic power production correlates well with power consumption for air-conditioning in warm countries. As of 2017, a handful of utilities have started combining PV installations with battery banks, thus obtaining several hours of dispatchable generation to help mitigate problems associated with the duck curve after sunset.

== Current status ==
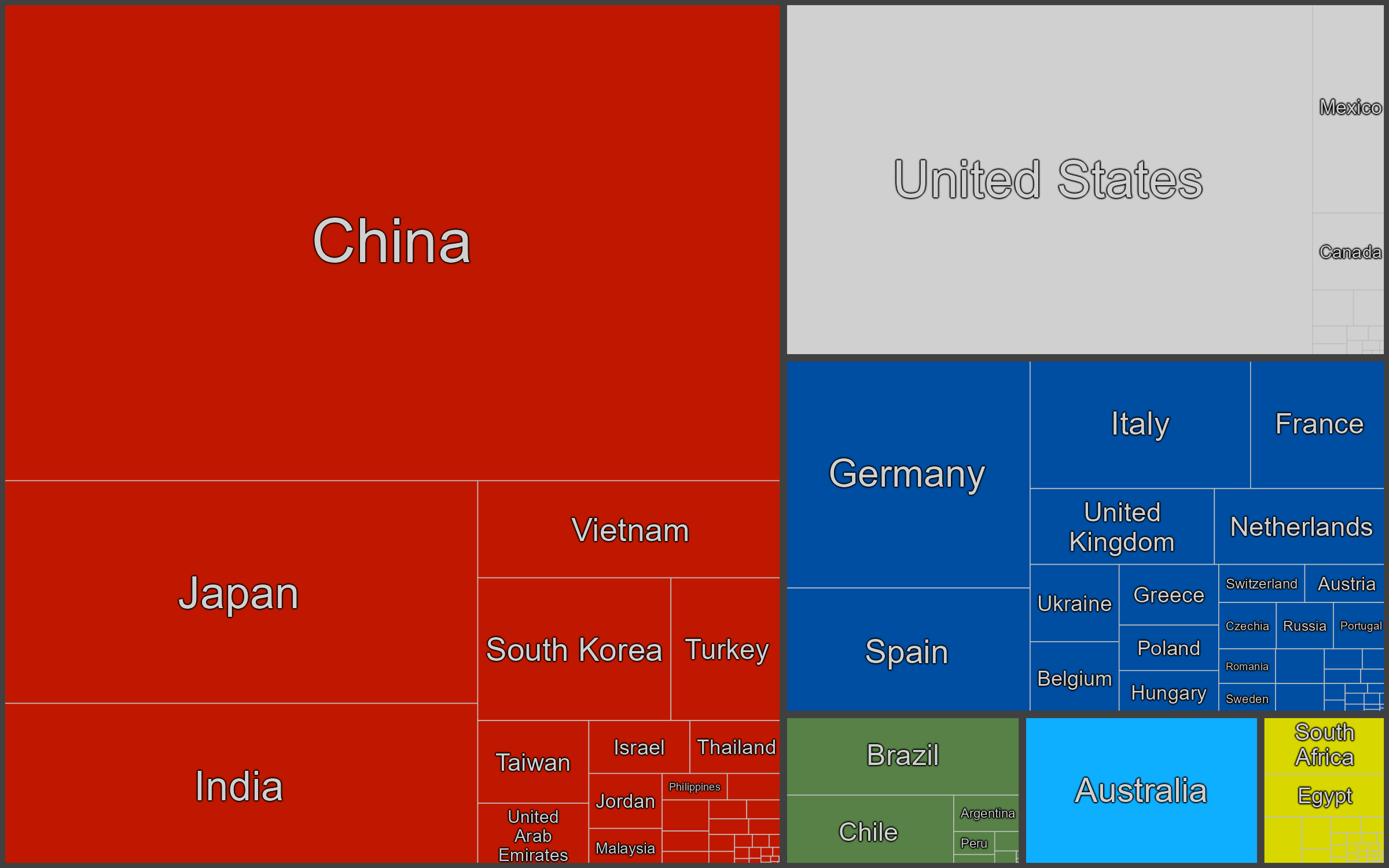
Solar generation by country, 2021

In 2024, the total global photovoltaic capacity increased by 601 GW, with a 29% growth year-on-year of new installations. As a result, the total global capacity exceeded 2,260 GW by the end of the year.

China was the biggest installer of solar in 2024, with 59.4% of global new capacity and 46% of total capacity with 1048 GW installed. India was the third largest installer of solar power with 31.9 GW of new solar for a cumulative capacity of 124.6 GW.

The United States were the second largest installer of solar in 2024 with 47.1 GW, although growth slowed from 50% in 2023 to 40% in 2024. By the end of 2024, the United States reached 225 GW of cumulative installed capacity.

Almost all of the solar in Oceania (39TWh) was generated in Australia in 2022, in either case amounting to 3% of the world total. However, Oceania had the highest proportion of electricity that was solar in 2022 at 12%, ahead of Europe (4.9%), Asia (4.9%) and the world overall (4.6%).

== History of leading countries ==
The growth of solar PV on a semi-log scale since 1996

The United States was the leader of installed photovoltaics for many years, and its total capacity was 77 megawatts in 1996, more than any other country in the world at the time. From the late 1990s, Japan was the world's leader of solar electricity production until 2005, when Germany took the lead and by 2016 had a capacity of over 40 gigawatts. In 2015, China surpassed Germany to become the world's largest producer of photovoltaic power, and in 2017 became the first country to surpass 100 GW of installed capacity. Leading countries per capita in 2022 were Australia, Netherlands and Germany.

=== United States (1954–1996) ===
The United States, where modern solar PV was invented, led installed capacity for many years. Based on preceding work by Swedish and German engineers, the American engineer Russell Ohl at Bell Labs patented the first modern solar cell in 1946. It was also there at Bell Labs where the first practical c-silicon cell was developed in 1954. Hoffman Electronics, the leading manufacturer of silicon solar cells in the 1950s and 1960s, improved on the cell's efficiency, produced solar radios, and equipped Vanguard I, the first solar powered satellite launched into orbit in 1958.

In 1977 US-President Jimmy Carter installed solar hot water panels on the White House (later removed by President Reagan) promoting solar energy and the National Renewable Energy Laboratory, originally named Solar Energy Research Institute was established at Golden, Colorado. The Carter administration provided major subsidies for research into photovoltaic technology and sought to increase commercialization in the industry.

In the early 1980s, the US accounted for more than 85% of the solar market.

During the Reagan administration, oil prices decreased and the US removed most of its policies that supported its solar industry. Government subsidies were higher in Germany and Japan, which prompted the industrial supply chain to begin moving from the US to those countries.

=== Japan (1997–2004) ===
Japan took the lead as the world's largest producer of PV electricity, after the city of Kobe was hit by the Great Hanshin earthquake in 1995. Kobe experienced severe power outages in the aftermath of the earthquake, and PV systems were then considered as a temporary supplier of power during such events, as the disruption of the electric grid paralyzed the entire infrastructure, including gas stations that depended on electricity to pump gasoline. Moreover, in December of that same year, an accident occurred at the multibillion-dollar experimental Monju Nuclear Power Plant. A sodium leak caused a major fire and forced a shutdown (classified as INES 1). There was massive public outrage when it was revealed that the semigovernmental agency in charge of Monju had tried to cover up the extent of the accident and resulting damage. Japan remained world leader in photovoltaics until 2004, when its capacity amounted to 1,132 megawatts. Then, focus on PV deployment shifted to Europe.

=== Germany (2005–2014) ===
In 2005, Germany took the lead from Japan. With the introduction of the Renewable Energy Act in 2000, feed-in tariffs were adopted as a policy mechanism. This policy established that renewables have priority on the grid, and that a fixed price must be paid for the produced electricity over a 20-year period, providing a guaranteed return on investment irrespective of actual market prices. As a consequence, a high level of investment security lead to a soaring number of new photovoltaic installations that peaked in 2011, while investment costs in renewable technologies were brought down considerably. In 2016 Germany's installed PV capacity was over the 40 GW mark.

=== China (2015–present) ===
China surpassed Germany's capacity by the end of 2015, becoming the world's largest producer of photovoltaic power. China's rapid PV growth continued in 2016 – with 34.2 GW of solar photovoltaics installed. The quickly lowering feed in tariff rates at the end of 2015 motivated many developers to secure tariff rates before mid-year 2016 – as they were anticipating further cuts (correctly so). During the course of the year, China announced its goal of installing 100 GW during the next Chinese Five Year Economic Plan (2016–2020). China expected to spend ¥1 trillion ($145B) on solar construction during that period. Much of China's PV capacity was built in the relatively less populated west of the country whereas the main centres of power consumption were in the east (such as Shanghai and Beijing). Due to lack of adequate power transmission lines to carry the power from the solar power plants, China had to curtail its PV generated power.

China continues to be the global leader in solar power generation and production as of at least 2024. China has one third of the world's installed solar panel capacity and is the largest domestic market for solar panels. 80% of the world's production in the solar industry is made by Chinese companies and their subsidiaries. Chinese firms are the most significant enterprises in almost all parts of the solar manufacturing supply chain, including polysilicon, silicon wafers, batteries, and photovoltaic modules.

== History of market development ==
=== Prices and costs (1977–present) ===
Swanson's law–stating that solar module prices have dropped about 20% for each doubling of installed capacity—defines the "learning curve" of solar photovoltaics.

Type of cell or module	Price per watt
Multi-Si cell (≥18.6%)	$0.071
Mono-Si cell (≥20.0%)	$0.090
G1 mono-Si cell (>21.7%)	$0.099
M6 mono-Si cell (>21.7%)	$0.100
275W - 280W (60P) module	$0.176
325W - 330W (72P) module	$0.188
305W - 310W module	$0.240
315W - 320W module	$0.190
>325W - >385W module	$0.200
Source: EnergyTrend, price quotes, average prices, 13 July 2020

The average price per watt dropped drastically for solar cells in the decades leading up to 2017. While in 1977 prices for crystalline silicon cells were about $77 per watt, average spot prices in August 2018 were as low as $0.13 per watt or nearly 600 times less than forty years ago. Prices for thin-film solar cells and for c-Si solar panels were around $.60 per watt. Module and cell prices declined even further after 2014 (see price quotes in table).

This price trend was seen as evidence supporting Swanson's law (an observation similar to the famous Moore's Law) that states that the per-watt cost of solar cells and panels fall by 20 percent for every doubling of cumulative photovoltaic production. A 2015 study showed price/kWh dropping by 10% per year since 1980, and predicted that solar could contribute 20% of total electricity consumption by 2030.

The followed figures for select countries represent the cost per kilowatt of utility-scale solar generation, as well as price per kilowatt-hour in 2022 and a comparison with 2010. Dollars are in 2022 international dollars. Data are from IRENA.

Country	$ / kW 2022	$ / kWh 2022	$/kWh 2010	% change
Australia	923	0.041	0.453	▼ -91%
China	715	0.037	0.331	▼ -89%
France	1,157	0.062	0.423	▼ -85%
Germany	996	0.080	0.401	▼ -80%
India	640	0.037	0.376	▼ -90%
South Korea	1,338	0.074	0.482	▼ -85%
Spain	778	0.046	0.348	▼ -87%
United States	1,119	0.058	0.235	▼ -75%

=== Technologies (1980s–present) ===
Global photovoltaics market share by technology 1980–2021

During the 1980s, Professor Martin Green developed numerous technologies which made solar power generation more efficient. Many of Green's students later became important in China's solar industry, including Shi Zhengrong (who founded Suntech with the support of Wuxi city government).

There were significant advances in conventional crystalline silicon (c-Si) technology in the years leading up to 2017. The falling cost of the polysilicon since 2009, that followed after a period of severe shortage (see below) of silicon feedstock, pressure increased on manufacturers of commercial thin-film PV technologies, including amorphous thin-film silicon (a-Si), cadmium telluride (CdTe), and copper indium gallium diselenide (CIGS), led to the bankruptcy of several thin-film companies that had once been highly touted. The sector faced price competition from Chinese crystalline silicon cell and module manufacturers, and some companies together with their patents were sold below cost.

Global PV market by technology in 2021
1. CdTe (4.10%)
2. a-Si (0.10%)
3. CIGS (0.80%)
4. mono-Si (82.0%)
5. multi-Si (13.0%)

In 2013 thin-film technologies accounted for about 9 percent of worldwide deployment, while 91 percent was held by crystalline silicon (mono-Si and multi-Si). With 5 percent of the overall market, CdTe held more than half of the thin-film market, leaving 2 percent to each CIGS and amorphous silicon.

- CIGS technology

Copper indium gallium selenide (CIGS) is the name of the semiconductor material on which the technology is based. One of the largest producers of CIGS photovoltaics in 2015 was the Japanese company Solar Frontier with a manufacturing capacity in the gigawatt-scale. Their CIS line technology included modules with conversion efficiencies of over 15%. The company profited from the booming Japanese market and attempted to expand its international business. However, several prominent manufacturers could not keep up with the advances in conventional crystalline silicon technology. The company Solyndra ceased all business activity and filed for Chapter 11 bankruptcy in 2011, and Nanosolar, also a CIGS manufacturer, closed in 2013. Although both companies produced CIGS solar cells, it has been pointed out that the failure was not due to the technology but rather because of the companies themselves, using a flawed architecture, such as, for example, Solyndra's cylindrical substrates.

- CdTe technology

The U.S. company First Solar, a leading manufacturer of CdTe, built several of the world's largest solar power stations, such as the Desert Sunlight Solar Farm and Topaz Solar Farm, both in the Californian desert with 550 MW capacity each, as well as the 102 MW_{AC} Nyngan Solar Plant in Australia (the largest PV power station in the Southern Hemisphere at the time) commissioned in mid-2015. The company was reported in 2013 to be successfully producing CdTe-panels with a steadily increasing efficiency and declining cost per watt. CdTe was the lowest energy payback time of all mass-produced PV technologies, and could be as short as eight months in favorable locations. The company Abound Solar, also a manufacturer of cadmium telluride modules, went bankrupt in 2012.

- a-Si technology

In 2012, ECD solar, once one of the world's leading manufacturer of amorphous silicon (a-Si) technology, filed for bankruptcy in Michigan, United States. Swiss OC Oerlikon divested its solar division that produced a-Si/μc-Si tandem cells to Tokyo Electron Limited. Other companies that left the amorphous silicon thin-film market include DuPont, BP, Flexcell, Inventux, Pramac, Schuco, Sencera, EPV Solar, NovaSolar (formerly OptiSolar) and Suntech Power that stopped manufacturing a-Si modules in 2010 to focus on crystalline silicon solar panels. In 2013, Suntech filed for bankruptcy in China.

=== Silicon shortage (2005–2008) ===
Polysilicon prices since 2004. As of July 2020, the ASP for polysilicon stands at $6.956/kg.

In the early 2000s, prices for polysilicon, the raw material for conventional solar cells, were as low as $30 per kilogram and silicon manufacturers had no incentive to expand production.

However, there was a severe silicon shortage in 2005, when governmental programmes caused a 75% increase in the deployment of solar PV in Europe. In addition, the demand for silicon from semiconductor manufacturers was growing. Since the amount of silicon needed for semiconductors makes up a much smaller portion of production costs, semiconductor manufacturers were able to outbid solar companies for the available silicon in the market.

Initially, the incumbent polysilicon producers were slow to respond to rising demand for solar applications, because of their painful experience with over-investment in the past. Silicon prices sharply rose to about $80 per kilogram, and reached as much as $400/kg for long-term contracts and spot prices. In 2007, the constraints on silicon became so severe that the solar industry was forced to idle about a quarter of its cell and module manufacturing capacity—an estimated 777 MW of the then available production capacity. The shortage also provided silicon specialists with both the cash and an incentive to develop new technologies and several new producers entered the market. Early responses from the solar industry focused on improvements in the recycling of silicon. When this potential was exhausted, companies have been taking a harder look at alternatives to the conventional Siemens process.

As it takes about three years to build a new polysilicon plant, the shortage continued until 2008. Prices for conventional solar cells remained constant or even rose slightly during the period of silicon shortage from 2005 to 2008. This is notably seen as a "shoulder" that sticks out in the Swanson's PV-learning curve and it was feared that a prolonged shortage could delay solar power becoming competitive with conventional energy prices without subsidies.

In the meantime the solar industry lowered the number of grams-per-watt by reducing wafer thickness and kerf loss, increasing yields in each manufacturing step, reducing module loss, and raising panel efficiency. Finally, the ramp up of polysilicon production alleviated worldwide markets from the scarcity of silicon in 2009 and subsequently lead to an overcapacity with sharply declining prices in the photovoltaic industry for the following years.

=== Solar overcapacity (2009–2013) ===
As the polysilicon industry had started to build additional large production capacities during the shortage period, prices dropped as low as $15 per kilogram forcing some producers to suspend production or exit the sector. Prices for silicon stabilized around $20 per kilogram and the booming solar PV market helped to reduce the enormous global overcapacity from 2009 onwards. However, overcapacity in the PV industry continued to persist. In 2013, global record deployment of 38 GW (updated EPIA figure) was still much lower than China's annual production capacity of approximately 60 GW. Continued overcapacity was further reduced by significantly lowering solar module prices and, as a consequence, many manufacturers could no longer cover costs or remain competitive. As worldwide growth of PV deployment continued, the gap between overcapacity and global demand was expected in 2014 to close in the next few years.

IEA-PVPS published in 2014 historical data for the worldwide utilization of solar PV module production capacity that showed a slow return to normalization in manufacture in the years leading up to 2014. The utilization rate is the ratio of production capacities versus actual production output for a given year. A low of 49% was reached in 2007 and reflected the peak of the silicon shortage that idled a significant share of the module production capacity. As of 2013, the utilization rate had recovered somewhat and increased to 63%.

=== Anti-dumping duties (2012–present) ===
After anti-dumping petition were filed and investigations carried out, the United States imposed tariffs of 31 percent to 250 percent on solar products imported from China in 2012. A year later, the EU also imposed definitive anti-dumping and anti-subsidy measures on imports of solar panels from China at an average of 47.7 percent for a two-year time span.

Shortly thereafter, China, in turn, levied duties on U.S. polysilicon imports, the feedstock for the production of solar cells. In January 2014, the Chinese Ministry of Commerce set its anti-dumping tariff on U.S. polysilicon producers, such as Hemlock Semiconductor Corporation to 57%, while other major polysilicon producing companies, such as German Wacker Chemie and Korean OCI were much less affected. All this has caused much controversy between proponents and opponents and was subject of debate.

== History of deployment ==
Solar and wind power are scaling up faster than previous sources of electricity. Declining costs, modular design, and improved battery storage help the transition to renewable energy, especially for solar.

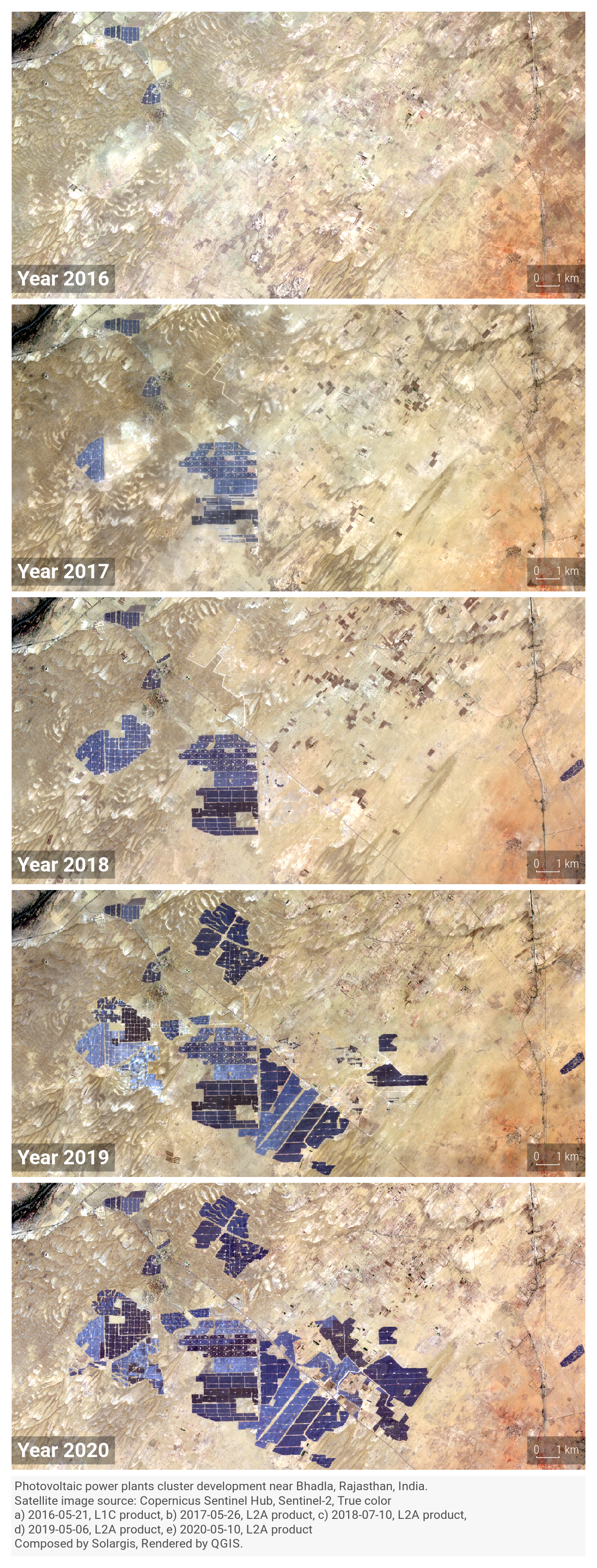
2016-2020 development of the Bhadla Solar Park (India), documented on Sentinel-2 satellite imagery

Deployment figures on a global, regional and nationwide scale are well documented since the early 1990s. While worldwide photovoltaic capacity grew continuously, deployment figures by country were much more dynamic, as they depended strongly on national policies. A number of organizations release comprehensive reports on PV deployment on a yearly basis. They include annual and cumulative deployed PV capacity, typically given in watt-peak, a break-down by markets, as well as in-depth analysis and forecasts about future trends.

Timeline of the largest PV power stations in the world
Year^{(a)}	Name of PV power station	Country	Capacity MW
1982	Lugo	United States	1
1985	Carrisa Plain	United States	5.6
2005	Bavaria Solarpark (Mühlhausen)	Germany	6.3
2006	Erlasee Solar Park	Germany	11.4
2008	Olmedilla Photovoltaic Park	Spain	60
2010	Sarnia Photovoltaic Power Plant	Canada	97
2011	Huanghe Hydropower Golmud Solar Park	China	200
2012	Agua Caliente Solar Project	United States	290
2014	Topaz Solar Farms^{(b)}	United States	550
2015	Talatan Solar Park	China	850
2016	Tengger Desert Solar Park	China	1547
2019	Pavagada Solar Park	India	2050
2020	Bhadla Solar Park	India	2245
2024	Midong Solar Park	China	3500
2025	Talatan Solar Park	China	8430
Also see list of photovoltaic power stations and list of notable solar parks (a) year of final commissioning (b) capacity given in MW_{AC} otherwise in MW_{DC}

=== Growth by year ===
Added capacity in gigawatts

annual deployment since 2002

2023: 413 GW (estimate)

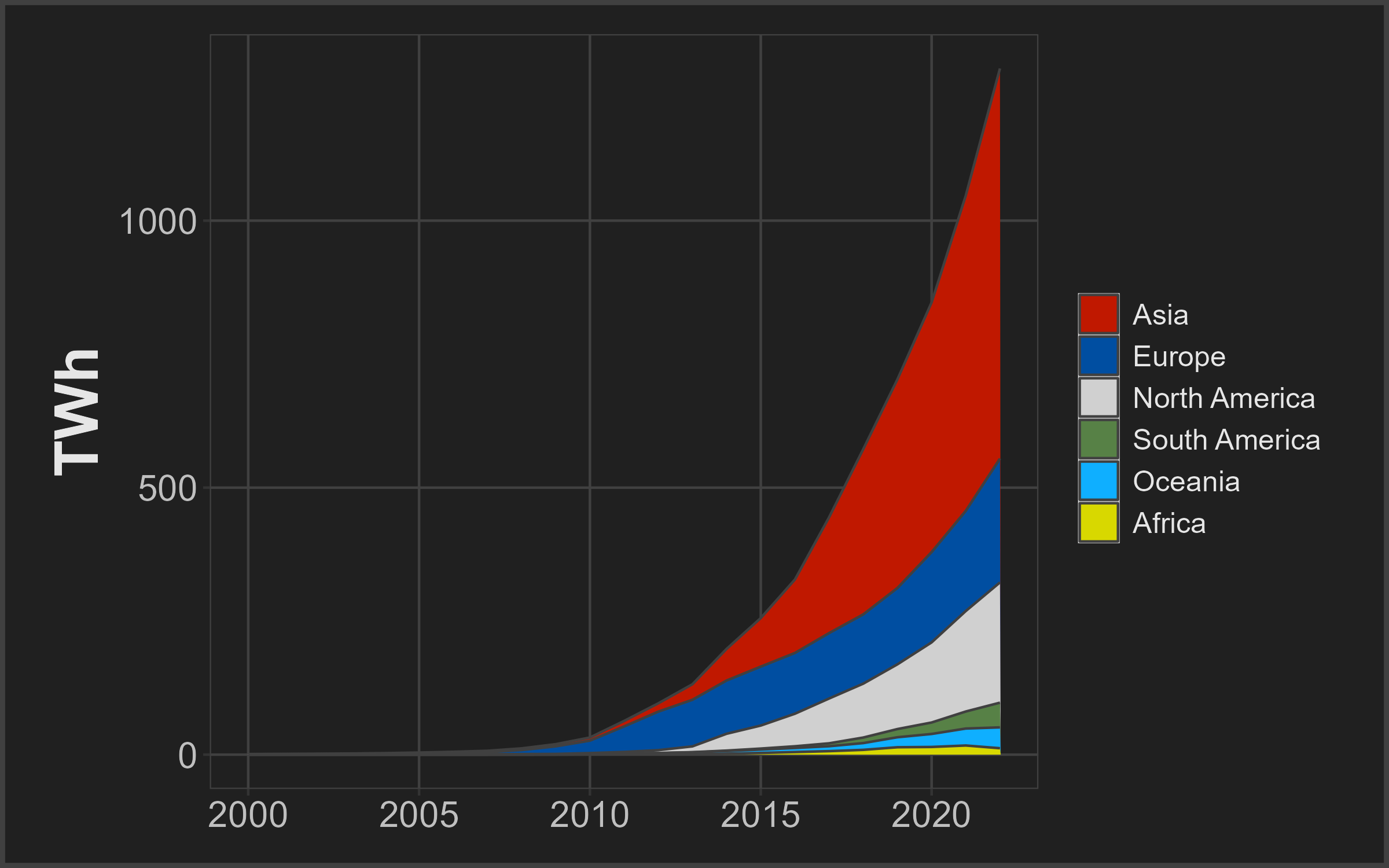
Yearly solar generation by continent

Grid parity for solar PV systems around the world Reached grid-parity before 2014 Reached grid-parity after 2014 Reached grid-parity only for peak prices U.S. states poised to reach grid-parity Source: Deutsche Bank, as of February 2015

Number of countries with PV
capacities in the gigawatt-scale

View chart definition.
Growing number of solar gigawatt-markets
Over 1 GW
- 2021	(Argentina)	(Pakistan)	(Kazakhstan)
  2020	(Portugal)	(Jordan)	(Sweden)	(Malaysia)
  2019	(Russia) (Hungary)	(Denmark) (Vietnam)	(Poland)	(United Arab Emirates)
  2018	(Mexico)	(Egypt)	(Ukraine)
  2017	(Philippines)	(Turkey)	(Israel)	(Brazil)
  2016	(Chile)	(Austria)
  2015	(Taiwan)	(Pakistan)	(South Africa)
  2014	(Thailand)	(Netherlands)	(Switzerland)
  2013	(Canada)	(Romania)
  2012	(Bulgaria)	(Greece)	(India)	(United Kingdom)
  2011	(Australia)	(China)
  2010	(Belgium)	(Czech Republic)	(France)
  2009	(Italy)
  2008	(Spain)	(United States)
  2004	(Japan)	(Germany)
Over 10 GW
- 2022	(Poland)
  2021	(Brazil)
  2020	(Spain)	(Vietnam)	(France)	(Netherlands)
  2019	(South Korea)
  2018	(Australia)
  2017	(India)
  2016	(United Kingdom)
  2013	(United States)	(Japan)	(China)
  2011	(Italy)
  2010	(Germany)
Over 100 GW
- 2025	(India)
  2021	(United States)
  2017	(China)
Over 1 TW
- 2025	(China)

Between 2000 and 2022, solar capacity increased by an average of 37% per year, doubling every 2.2 years. Over the same time period, the capacity factor increased from 10% to 14%. Data in the following table are from Ember, released from 2024 to 2026, with earlier data from BP released in 2014.

Year	Gen (TWh)	% gen.	Cap. (GW)	% cap. growth	Cap. fac.
BP data
1989	0.3				
1990	0.4				
1991	0.5				
1992	0.5				
1993	0.6				
1994	0.6				
1995	0.6				
1996	0.7		0.3		
1997	0.7		0.4	37%	
1998	0.8		0.6	34%	
1999	0.9		0.8	43%	
Ember data
2000	1.1	0.01	1.2		10%
2001	1.4	0.01	1.5	20%	11%
2002	1.7	0.01	1.8	24%	11%
2003	2.1	0.01	2.4	28%	10%
2004	2.8	0.02	3.4	46%	9%
2005	4.0	0.02	5.0	44%	9%
2006	5.4	0.03	6.5	31%	9%
2007	7.3	0.04	9.0	38%	9%
2008	11.9	0.06	15.3	70%	9%
2009	19.8	0.10	23.6	55%	9%
2010	32.2	0.15	41.6	76%	9%
2011	63.6	0.29	73.9	78%	10%
2012	97.0	0.43	104.2	41%	11%
2013	132.0	0.57	141.4	36%	11%
2014	197.7	0.83	180.8	28%	13%
2015	256.0	1.07	229.1	27%	13%
2016	328.1	1.33	301.2	31%	12%
2017	445.2	1.75	396.3	32%	13%
2018	574.1	2.17	492.6	24%	13%
2019	704.8	2.63	595.5	21%	13%
2020	853.7	3.20	728.4	22%	13%
2021	1048.5	3.72	873.9	20%	14%
2022	1315.5	4.56	1073.1	23%	14%
2023	1637.6	5.54	1419.0	32%	13%
2024	2128.95	6.88	1865.45	31%	13%
2025	2806.62	8.79	2391.47	28%	

== See also ==
- Growth of concentrated solar power (CSP)
- List of renewable energy topics by country and territory
- Solar power by country
- Timeline of solar cells
- Wind power by country
