= Abound =

Abound may refer to:

- Abound Solar, a former solar energy technology company
- Abound (fungicide), a brand name for Azoxystrobin
