= Close-space sublimation =

Method of producing thin-films

Closed space sublimation is a method of producing thin-films, esp. cadmium telluride photovoltaics, though it is used for other materials like antimony triselenide.

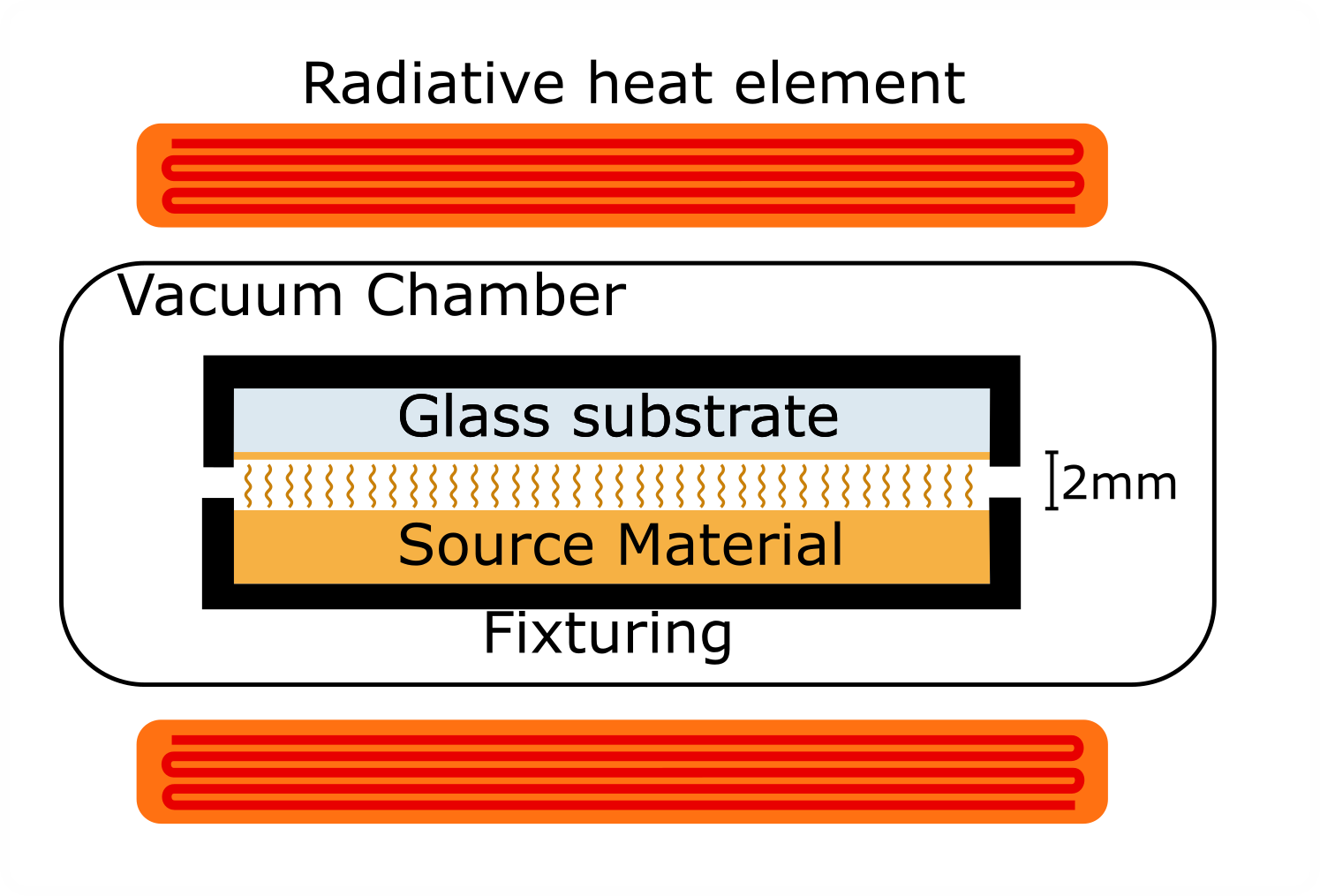
Diagram showing working principle of CSS

It is a type of physical vapor deposition where the substrate to be coated and the source material are held close to one another. They are both placed in a vacuum chamber, which is pumped down. The source and substrate are then heated. The source is heated to some fraction of its melting temperature, and the substrate some lower temperature e.g. 640 °C and 600 °C, respectively. This causes sublimation of the source, allowing vapors to travel a short distance to the substrate, where they condense, producing a thin film. This short-path diffusion is similar in principle to short-path distillation. Compared to other techniques, it is a relevantly insensitive process, and takes as little as 15 minutes for an entire cycle. This makes it a very viable technique for large-scale manufacturing.
