= Amorphous silicon =

Non-crystalline silicon

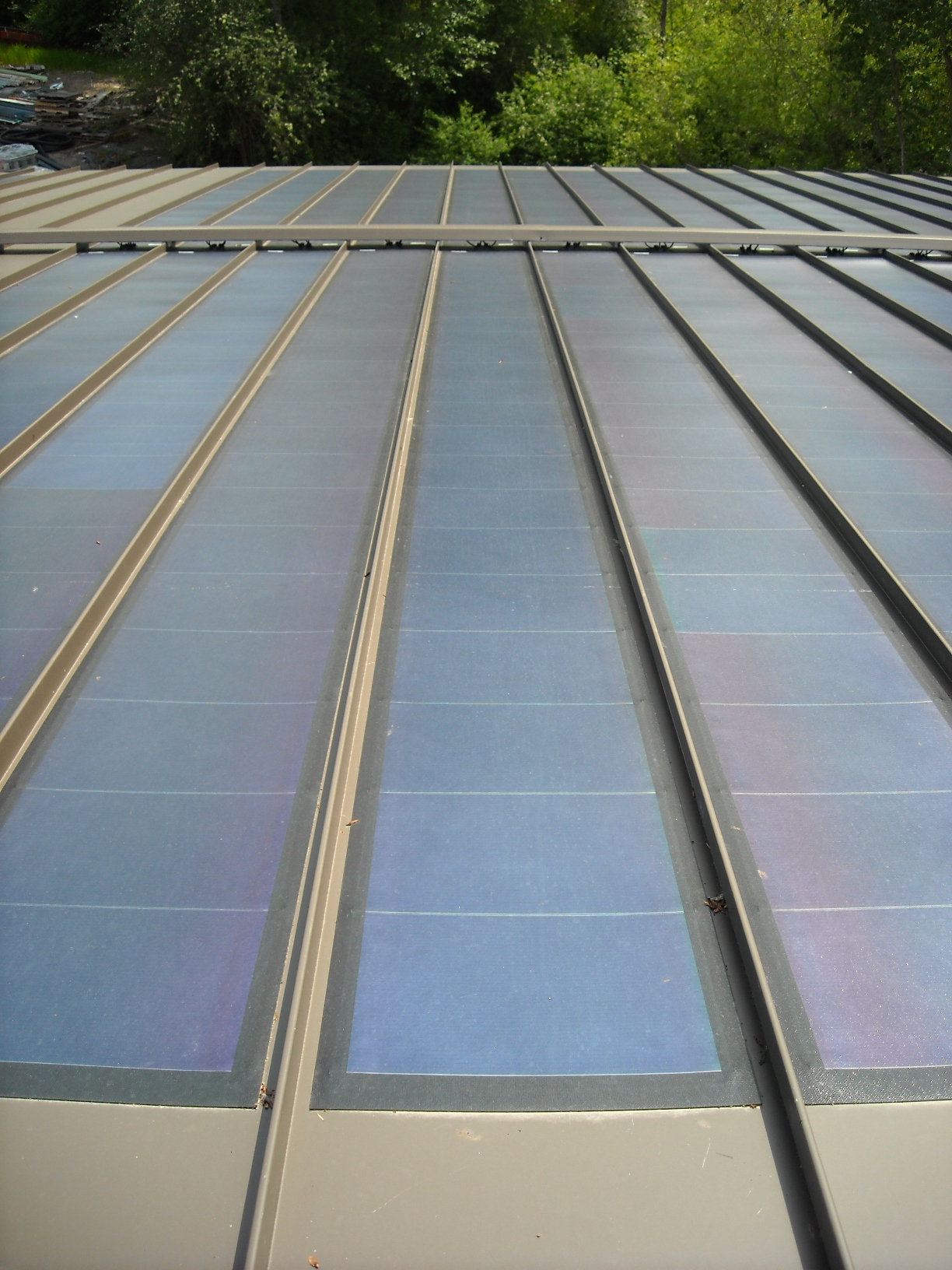
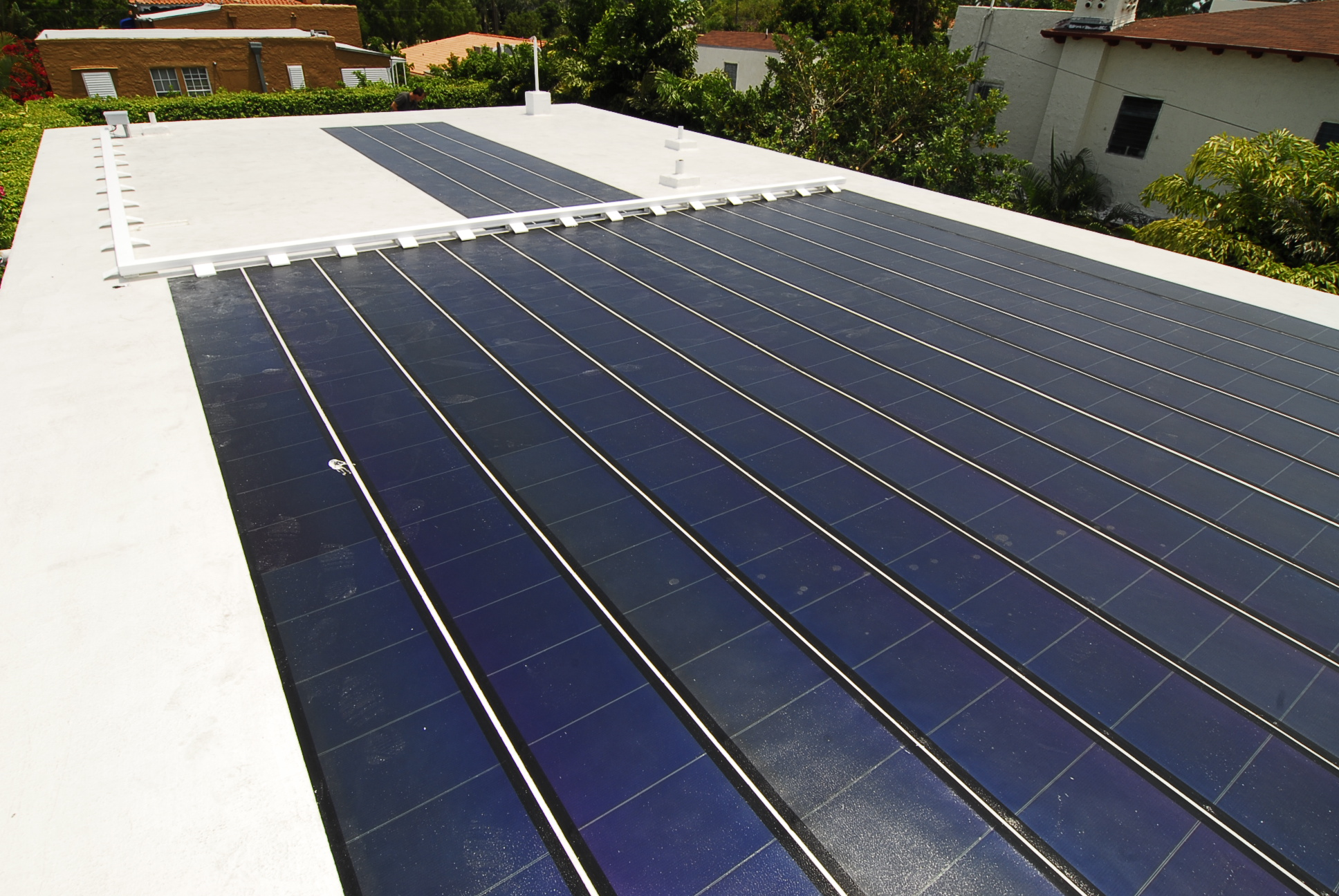
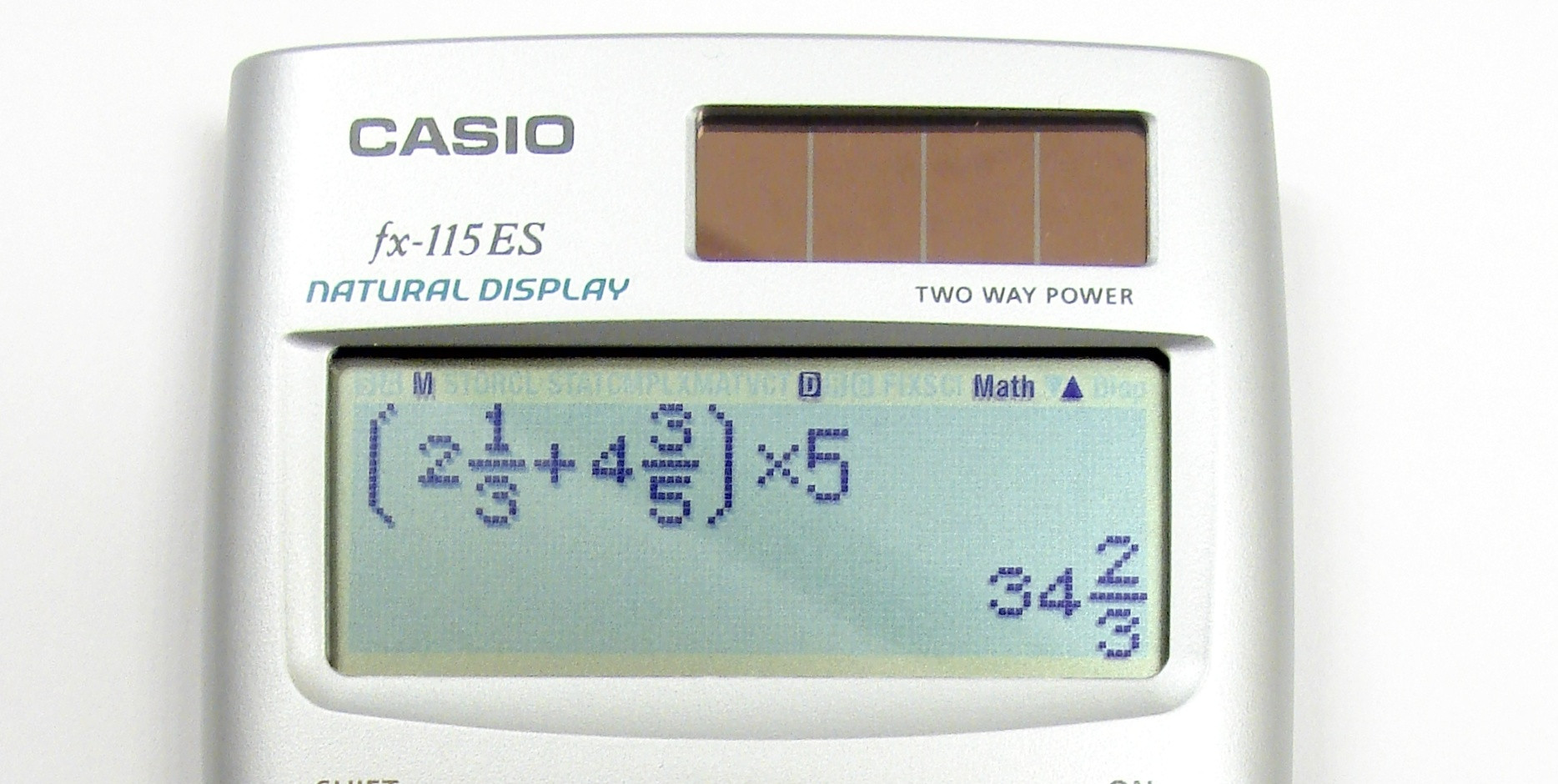
Amorphous silicon:
- Thin-film silicon solar panels on rooftop
- Schematic structures of crystalline silicon, amorphous silicon, and amorphous hydrogenated silicon
- Solar calculator with amorphous solar cell (upper right corner) and LCDs.

Amorphous silicon (a-Si) is the non-crystalline form of silicon used to create solar cells in solar panels and thin-film transistors in LCDs.

Used as semiconductor material for a-Si solar cells, or thin-film silicon solar cells, it is deposited in thin films onto a variety of flexible substrates, such as glass, metal and plastic. Amorphous silicon cells generally feature low efficiency.

Amorphous silicon is a second-generation thin-film solar cell technology. Although its share of the worldwide photovoltaic market declined relative to crystalline silicon and alternative cells such as CdTe and CIGS. Amorphous silicon is still a used material for manufacturers for the thin film transistor (TFT) elements of liquid crystal displays (LCDs) and for x-ray imagers.

Amorphous silicon differs from other allotropic variations, such as monocrystalline silicon—a single crystal, and polycrystalline silicon, that consists of small grains, also known as crystallites.

== Description ==
Silicon is a fourfold coordinated atom that is normally tetrahedrally bonded to four neighboring silicon atoms. In crystalline silicon (c-Si) this tetrahedral structure continues over a large range, thus forming a well-ordered crystal lattice.

In amorphous silicon this long range order is not present. Rather, the atoms form a continuous random network. Moreover, not all the atoms within amorphous silicon are fourfold coordinated. Due to the disordered nature of the material some atoms have a dangling bond. Physically, these dangling bonds represent defects in the continuous random network and may cause anomalous electrical behavior.

The material can be passivated by hydrogen, which bonds to the dangling bonds and can reduce the dangling bond density by several orders of magnitude. Hydrogenated amorphous silicon (a-Si:H) has a sufficiently low amount of defects to be used within devices such as solar photovoltaic cells, particularly in the protocrystalline growth regime. However, hydrogenation is associated with light-induced degradation of the material, termed the Staebler–Wronski effect.

Schematic of allotropic forms of silicon: monocrystalline, polycrystalline, and amorphous silicon

== Amorphous silicon and carbon ==
Amorphous alloys of silicon and carbon (amorphous silicon carbide, also hydrogenated, a-Si_{1−x}C_{x}:H) are an interesting variant. Introduction of carbon atoms adds extra degrees of freedom for control of the properties of the material. The film could also be made transparent to visible light.

Increasing the concentration of carbon in the alloy widens the electronic gap between conduction and valence bands (also called "optical gap" and bandgap). This increases the light efficiency of solar cells made with amorphous silicon carbide layers. On the other hand, the electronic properties as a semiconductor (mainly electron mobility), are adversely affected by the increasing content of carbon in the alloy, presumably due to the increased disorder in the atomic network.

Several studies are found in the scientific literature, mainly investigating the effects of deposition parameters on electronic quality, but practical applications of amorphous silicon carbide in commercial devices are still lacking.

== Properties ==
The density of a-Si depends on preparation conditions, for example, for electron beam evaporated films the density depends on thickness, growth temperature and rate, ranging from 3.90×10^{22} to 4.95×10^{22} atom/cm^{3} (1.82 to 2.31 g/cm^{3}), while for ion implanted a-Si it was determined as 4.90×10^{22} atom/cm^{3} (2.29 g/cm^{3}) at 300 K. Silicon is one of the few elements that expands upon cooling and has a lower density as a solid than as a liquid.

== Hydrogenated amorphous silicon ==
Unhydrogenated a-Si has a very high defect density which leads to undesirable semiconductor properties such as poor photoconductivity and prevents doping which is critical to engineering semiconductor properties. By introducing hydrogen during the fabrication of amorphous silicon, photoconductivity is significantly improved and doping is made possible. Hydrogenated amorphous silicon, a-Si:H, was first fabricated in 1969 by Robert Carnegie Chittick, who recently passed away on 16th March 2026, Alexander and Sterling by deposition using a silane gas (SiH_{4}) precursor. The resulting material showed a lower defect density and increased conductivity due to impurities. Interest in a-Si:H came when (in 1975), LeComber and Spear discovered the ability for substitutional doping of a-Si:H using phosphine (n-type) or diborane (p-type). The role of hydrogen in reducing defects was verified by Paul's group at Harvard who found a hydrogen concentration of about 10 atomic % through IR vibration, which for Si-H bonds has a frequency of about 2000 cm^{−1}. Starting in the 1970s, a-Si:H was developed in solar cells by David E. Carlson and C. R. Wronski at RCA Laboratories. Conversion efficiency steadily climbed to about 13.6% in 2015.

== Deposition processes ==
	CVD	PECVD	Catalytic CVD	Sputtering
Type of film	a-Si:H	a-Si:H	a-Si:H	a-Si
Unique application		Large-area electronics		Hydrogen-free deposition
Chamber temperature	600C	30–300C		30–1000C
Active element temperature			2000C	
Chamber pressure	0.1–10 Torr	0.1–10 Torr		0.001–0.1 Torr
Physical principle	Thermolysis	Plasma-induced dissociation	Thermolysis	Ionization of Si source
Facilitators			W/Ta heated wires	Argon cations
Typical drive voltage		RF 13.56 MHz; 0.01-1W/cm^{2}		
Si source	SiH_{4} gas	SiH_{4} gas	SiH_{4} gas	Target
Substrate temperature	controllable	controllable	controllable	controllable

== Applications ==
While a-Si suffers from lower electronic performance compared to c-Si, it is much more flexible in its applications. For example, a-Si layers can be made thinner than c-Si, which may produce savings on silicon material cost.

One further advantage is that a-Si can be deposited at very low temperatures, e.g., as low as 75 degrees Celsius. This allows deposition on not only glass, but on plastic or even on paper substrates as well, making it a candidate for a roll-to-roll processing technique. Once deposited, a-Si can be doped in a fashion similar to c-Si, to form p-type or n-type layers and ultimately to form electronic devices.

Another advantage is that a-Si can be deposited over large areas by PECVD. The design of the PECVD system has great impact on the production cost of such panel, therefore most equipment suppliers put their focus on the design of PECVD for higher throughput, that leads to lower manufacturing cost particularly when the silane is recycled.

Arrays of small (under 1 mm by 1 mm) a-Si photodiodes on glass are used as visible-light image sensors in some flat panel detectors for fluoroscopy and radiography.

=== Photovoltaics ===
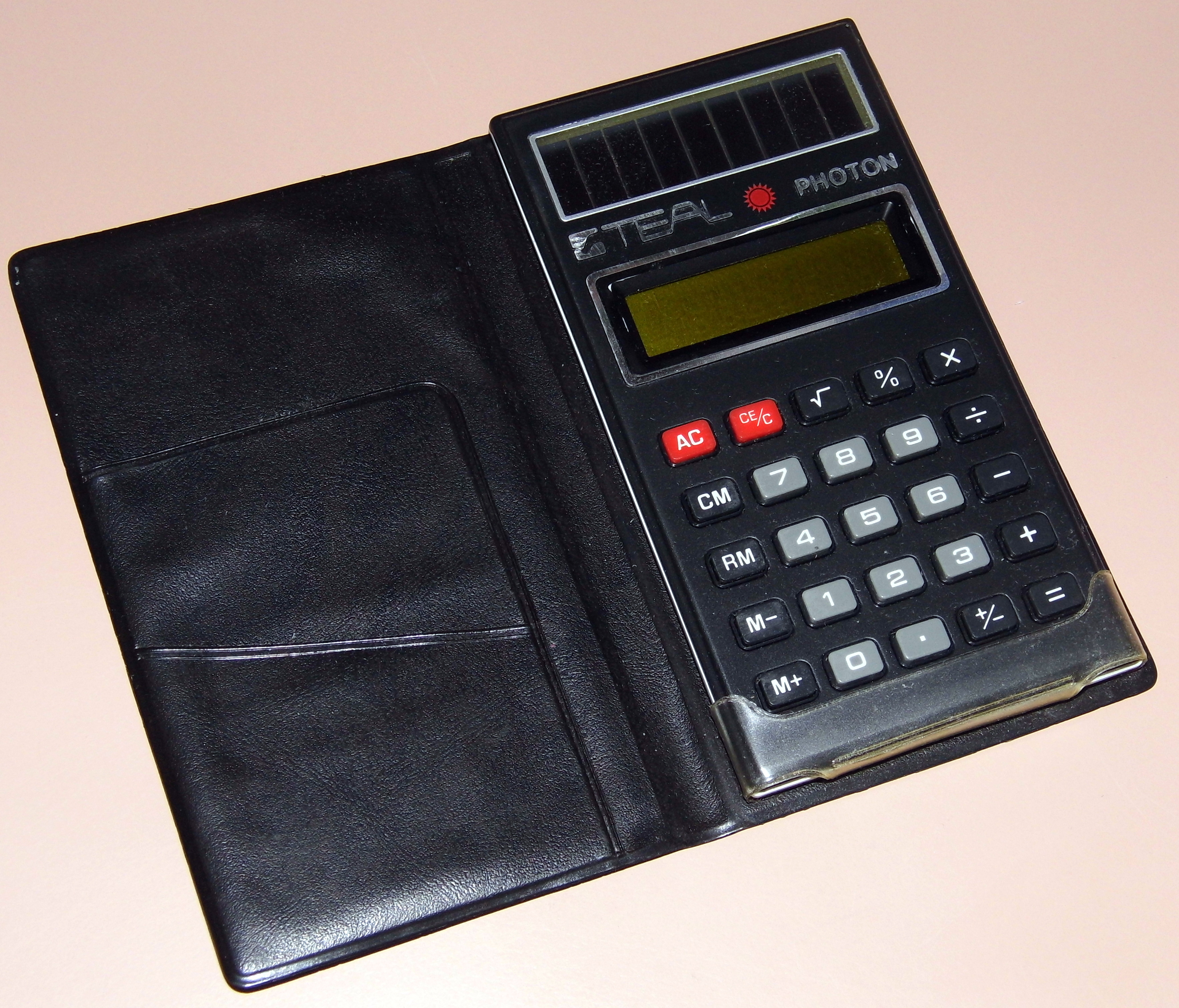
The "Teal Photon" solar-powered calculator produced in the late 1970s

Hydrogenated amorphous silicon (a-Si:H) has been used as a photovoltaic solar cell material for devices which require very little power, such as pocket calculators, because their lower performance compared to conventional crystalline silicon (c-Si) solar cells is more than offset by their simplified and lower cost of deposition onto a substrate. Moreover, the vastly higher shunt resistance of the p-i-n device means that acceptable performance is achieved even at very low light levels. The first solar-powered calculators were already available in the late 1970s, such as the Royal Solar 1, Sharp EL-8026, and Teal Photon.

More recently, improvements in a-Si:H construction techniques have made them more attractive for large-area solar cell use as well. Here their lower inherent efficiency is made up, at least partially, by their thinness – higher efficiencies can be reached by stacking several thin-film cells on top of each other, each one tuned to work well at a specific frequency of light. This approach is not applicable to c-Si cells, which are thick as a result of its indirect band-gap and are therefore largely opaque, blocking light from reaching other layers in a stack.

The source of the low efficiency of amorphous silicon photovoltaics is due largely to the low hole mobility of the material. This low hole mobility has been attributed to many physical aspects of the material, including the presence of dangling bonds (silicon with 3 bonds), floating bonds (silicon with 5 bonds), as well as bond reconfigurations. While much work has been done to control these sources of low mobility, evidence suggests that the multitude of interacting defects may lead to the mobility being inherently limited, as reducing one type of defect leads to formation others.

The main advantage of a-Si:H in large scale production is not efficiency, but cost. a-Si:H cells use only a fraction of the silicon needed for typical c-Si cells, and the cost of the silicon has historically been a significant contributor to cell cost. However, the higher costs of manufacture due to the multi-layer construction have, to date, made a-Si:H unattractive except in roles where their thinness or flexibility are an advantage.

Typically, amorphous silicon thin-film cells use a p-i-n structure. The placement of the p-type layer on top is also due to the lower hole mobility, allowing the holes to traverse a shorter average distance for collection to the top contact. Typical panel structure includes front side glass, TCO, thin-film silicon, back contact, polyvinyl butyral (PVB) and back side glass. Uni-Solar, a division of Energy Conversion Devices produced a version of flexible backings, used in roll-on roofing products. However, the world's largest manufacturer of amorphous silicon photovoltaics had to file for bankruptcy in 2012, as it could not compete with the rapidly declining prices of conventional solar panels.

==== Microcrystalline and micromorphous silicon ====
Microcrystalline silicon (also called nanocrystalline silicon) is amorphous silicon, but also contains small crystals. It absorbs a broader spectrum of light and is flexible. Micromorphous silicon module technology combines two different types of silicon, amorphous and microcrystalline silicon, in a top and a bottom photovoltaic cell. Sharp produces cells using this system in order to more efficiently capture blue light, increasing the efficiency of the cells during the time where there is no direct sunlight falling on them. Protocrystalline silicon is often used to optimize the open circuit voltage of a-Si photovoltaics.

==== Large-scale production ====
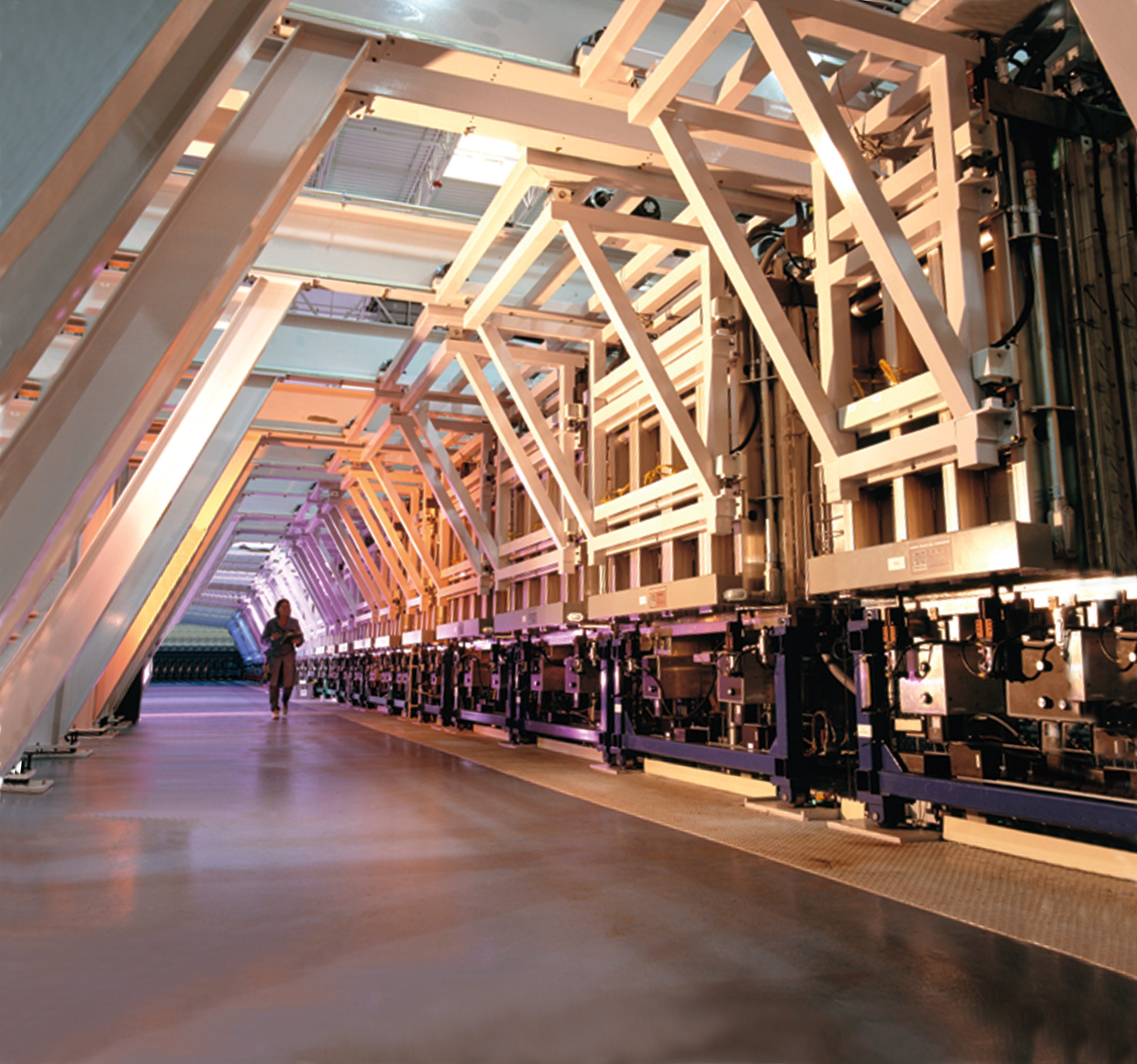
United Solar Ovonic roll-to-roll solar photovoltaic production line with 30 MW annual capacity

Xunlight Corporation, which has received over $40 million of institutional investments, has completed the installation of its first 25 MW wide-web, roll-to-roll photovoltaic manufacturing equipment for the production of thin-film silicon PV modules. Anwell Technologies has also completed the installation of its first 40 MW a-Si thin film solar panel manufacturing facility in Henan with its in-house designed multi-substrate-multi-chamber PECVD equipment.

==== Photovoltaic thermal hybrid solar collectors ====
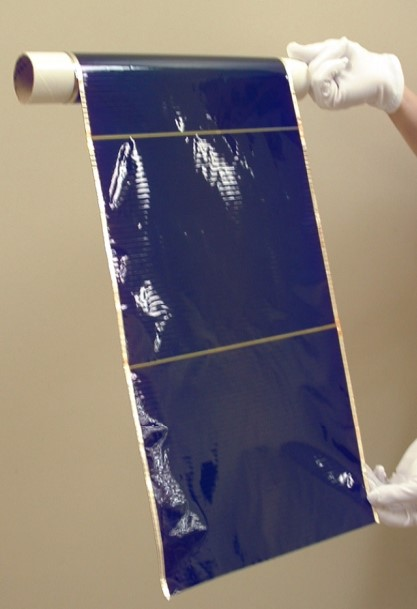
Aerospace product with flexible thin-film solar PV from United Solar Ovonic

Photovoltaic thermal hybrid solar collectors (PVT), are systems that convert solar radiation into electrical energy and thermal energy. These systems combine a solar cell, which converts electromagnetic radiation (photons) into electricity, with a solar thermal collector, which captures the remaining energy and removes waste heat from the solar PV module. Solar cells suffer from a drop in efficiency with the rise in temperature due to increased resistance. Most such systems can be engineered to carry heat away from the solar cells thereby cooling the cells and thus improving their efficiency by lowering resistance. Although this is an effective method, it causes the thermal component to under-perform compared to a solar thermal collector. Recent research showed that a-Si:H PV with low temperature coefficients allow the PVT to be operated at high temperatures, creating a more symbiotic PVT system and improving performance of the a-Si:H PV by about 10%.

=== Thin-film-transistor liquid-crystal display ===
Amorphous silicon has become the material of choice for the active layer in thin-film transistors (TFTs), which are most widely used in large-area electronics applications, mainly for liquid-crystal displays (LCDs).

Thin-film-transistor liquid-crystal display (TFT-LCD) show a similar circuit layout process to that of semiconductor products. However, rather than fabricating the transistors from silicon, that is formed into a crystalline silicon wafer, they are made from a thin film of amorphous silicon that is deposited on a glass panel. The silicon layer for TFT-LCDs is typically deposited using the PECVD process. Transistors take up only a small fraction of the area of each pixel and the rest of the silicon film is etched away to allow light to easily pass through it.

Polycrystalline silicon is sometimes used in displays requiring higher TFT performance. Examples include small high-resolution displays such as those found in projectors or viewfinders. Amorphous silicon-based TFTs are by far the most common, due to their lower production cost, whereas polycrystalline silicon TFTs are more costly and much more difficult to produce.

== See also ==
- Atomic layer deposition (ALD)
- Chemical-mechanical planarization (CMP)
- Chemical vapor deposition (CVD)
- Crystalline silicon
- Ion implantation
- Nanoparticle
- Physical vapor deposition (PVD)
- Protocrystalline
- Rapid thermal processing (RTP)
