= Monocrystalline silicon =

Form of silicon with a continuous, unbroken crystal lattice

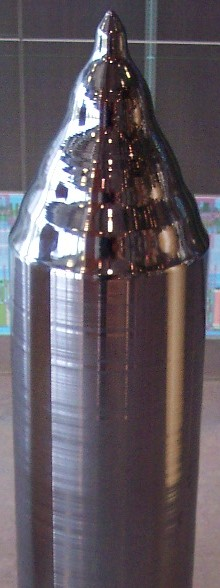
A silicon ingot

Monocrystalline silicon, often referred to as single-crystal silicon or simply mono-Si, is a critical material widely used in modern electronics and photovoltaics. As the foundation for silicon-based discrete components and integrated circuits, it plays a vital role in virtually all modern electronic equipment, from computers to smartphones. Additionally, mono-Si serves as a highly efficient light-absorbing material for the production of solar cells, making it indispensable in the renewable energy sector.

It consists of silicon in which the crystal lattice of the entire solid is continuous, unbroken to its edges, and free of any grain boundaries (i.e. a single crystal). Mono-Si can be prepared as an intrinsic semiconductor that consists only of exceedingly pure silicon, or it can be doped by the addition of other elements such as boron or phosphorus to make p-type or n-type silicon. Due to its semiconducting properties, single-crystal silicon is perhaps the most important technological material of the last few decades—the "silicon era". Its availability at an affordable cost has been essential for the development of the electronic devices on which the present-day electronics and IT revolution is based.

Monocrystalline silicon differs from other allotropic forms, such as non-crystalline amorphous silicon—used in thin-film solar cells—and polycrystalline silicon, which consists of small crystals known as crystallites.

== Production ==
Monocrystalline silicon is generally created by one of several methods that involve melting high-purity, semiconductor-grade silicon (only a few parts per million of impurities) and the use of a seed to initiate the formation of a continuous single crystal. This process is normally performed in an inert atmosphere, such as argon, and in an inert crucible, such as quartz, to avoid impurities that would affect the crystal uniformity.

The most common production technique is the Czochralski method, which dips a precisely oriented rod-mounted seed crystal into the molten silicon. The rod is then slowly pulled upwards while rotated simultaneously, allowing the pulled material to solidify into a monocrystalline cylindrical ingot up to 2 meters in length and weighing several hundred kilograms. Magnetic fields may also be applied to control and suppress turbulent flow, further improving the uniformity of the crystallization. Other methods are zone melting, which passes a polycrystalline silicon rod through a radiofrequency heating coil that creates a localized molten zone, from which a seed crystal ingot grows, and Bridgman techniques, which move the crucible through a temperature gradient to cool it from the end of the container containing the seed. The solidified ingots are then sliced into thin wafers during a process called wafering. After post-wafering processing, the wafers are ready for use in fabrication.

Compared to the casting of polycrystalline ingots, the production of monocrystalline silicon is very slow and expensive. However, the demand for mono-Si continues to rise due to the superior electronic properties—the lack of grain boundaries allows better charge carrier flow and prevents electron recombination—allowing improved performance of integrated circuits and photovoltaics.

== In electronics ==
The primary application of monocrystalline silicon is in the production of discrete components and integrated circuits. Ingots made by the Czochralski method are sliced into wafers about 0.75 mm thick and polished to obtain a regular, flat substrate, onto which microelectronic devices are built through various microfabrication processes, such as doping or ion implantation, etching, deposition of various materials, and photolithographic patterning.

A single continuous crystal is critical for electronics, since grain boundaries, impurities, and crystallographic defects can significantly impact the local electronic properties of the material, which in turn affects the functionality, performance, and reliability of semiconductor devices by interfering with their proper operation. For example, without crystalline perfection, it would be virtually impossible to build very large-scale integration (VLSI) devices, in which billions of transistor-based circuits, all of which must function reliably, are combined into a single chip to form a microprocessor. As such, the electronics industry has invested heavily in facilities to produce large single crystals of silicon.

== In solar cells ==
Global market-share in terms of annual production by PV technology since 1980

Monocrystalline silicon is also used for high-performance photovoltaic (PV) devices. Since there are less stringent demands on structural imperfections compared to microelectronics applications, lower-quality solar-grade silicon (Sog-Si) is often used for solar cells. Despite this, the monocrystalline-silicon photovoltaic industry has benefitted greatly from the development of faster mono-Si production methods for the electronics industry.

=== Market share ===
In the past, monocrystalline solar panels have historically taken up a significantly smaller market share of PV solar manufacturing globally compared to polysilicon technologies due to the latter's lower cost and ease of manufacture. However monocrystalline market share has been growing rapidly since at least 2018. In recent years the price gap between the two technologies has narrowed, both in an absolute sense (panel cost per watt), and in LCoE. This has contributed in monocrystalline becoming the dominant technology, with some studies even showing faster payback periods for monocrystalline despite higher upfront cost. This is especially true if space is considered, since the higher efficiency panels can either use less land or roof-space, or produce more energy in the same area.

=== Efficiency ===
With a recorded single-junction cell lab efficiency of 26.7%, monocrystalline silicon has the highest confirmed conversion efficiency out of all commercial PV technologies, ahead of poly-Si (22.3%) and established thin-film technologies, such as CIGS cells (21.7%), CdTe cells (21.0%), and a-Si cells (10.2%). Solar module efficiencies for mono-Si—which are always lower than those of their corresponding cells—finally crossed the 20% mark for in 2012 and hit 24.4% in 2016. The high efficiency is largely attributable to the lack of recombination sites in the single crystal and better absorption of photons due to its black color, as compared to the characteristic blue hue of poly-silicon. Since they are more expensive than their polycrystalline counterparts, mono-Si cells are useful for applications where the main considerations are limitations on weight or available area.

=== Manufacturing ===
Besides the low production rate, there are also concerns over wasted material in the manufacturing process. Creating space-efficient solar panels requires cutting the circular wafers (a product of the cylindrical ingots formed through the Czochralski process) into octagonal cells that can be packed closely together. The leftover material is not used to create PV cells and is either discarded or recycled by going back to ingot production for melting. Furthermore, even though mono-Si cells can absorb the majority of photons within 20 μm of the incident surface, limitations on the ingot sawing process mean commercial wafer thickness are generally around 200 μm. However, advances in technology are expected to reduce wafer thicknesses to 140 μm by 2026.

Other manufacturing methods are being researched, such as direct wafer epitaxial growth, which involves growing gaseous layers on reusable silicon substrates. Newer processes may allow growth of square crystals that can then be processed into thinner wafers without compromising quality or efficiency, thereby eliminating the waste from traditional ingot sawing and cutting methods.

== Comparison with other forms of silicon ==
Monocrystalline silicon differs significantly from other forms of silicon used in solar technology, particularly polycrystalline silicon and amorphous silicon:

- Polycrystalline silicon: Composed of many small crystals (crystallites), polycrystalline silicon is more affordable to produce but less efficient than monocrystalline silicon in both electronics and solar cells. Its electrical conductivity is hindered by grain boundaries, reducing overall performance.
- Amorphous silicon: Non-crystalline and used mainly in thin-film solar cells, amorphous silicon is lightweight and flexible, but its efficiency is much lower compared to monocrystalline silicon. It is often employed in niche applications where space or flexibility is more important than efficiency.

== Appearance ==
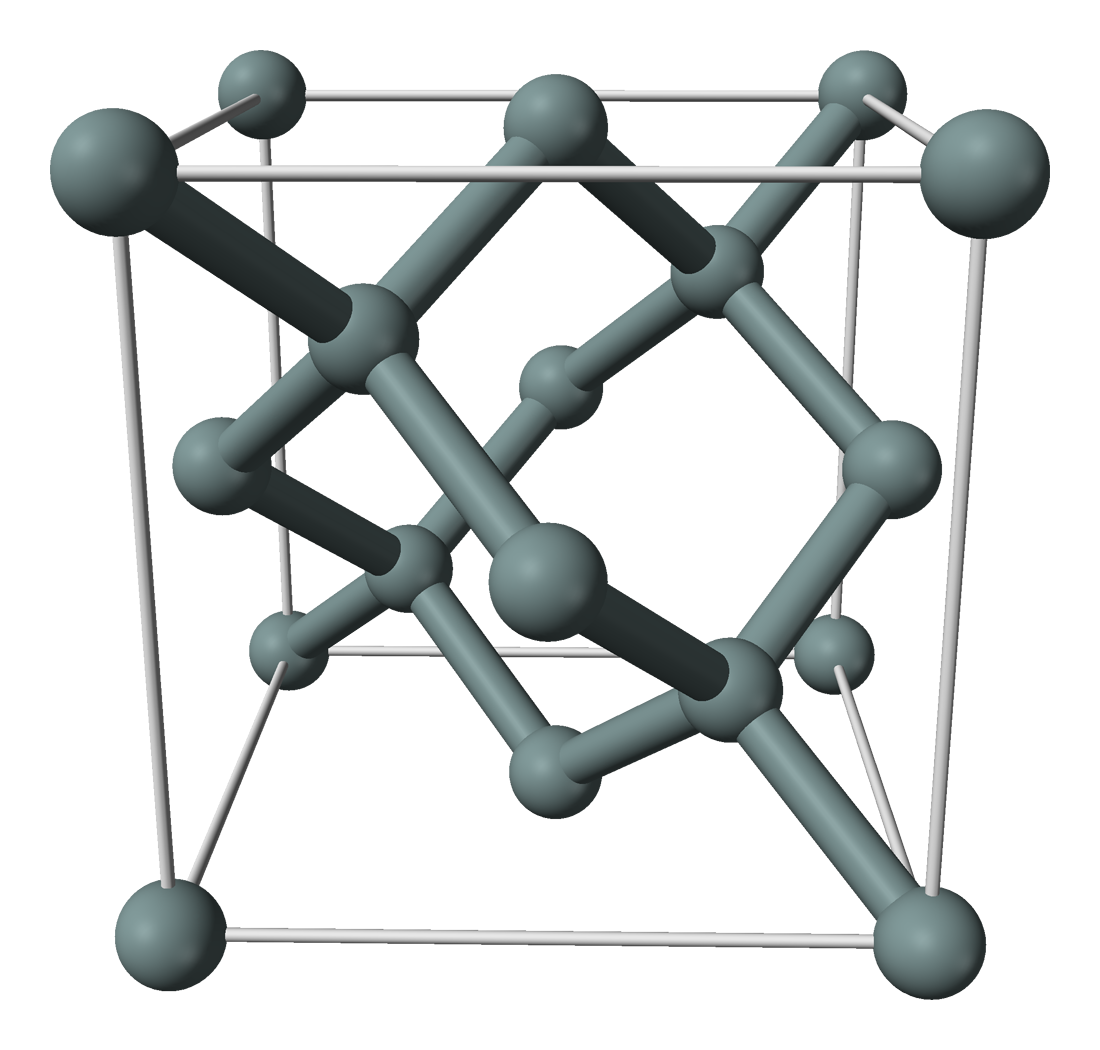
The crystal structure of silicon forms a diamond cubic

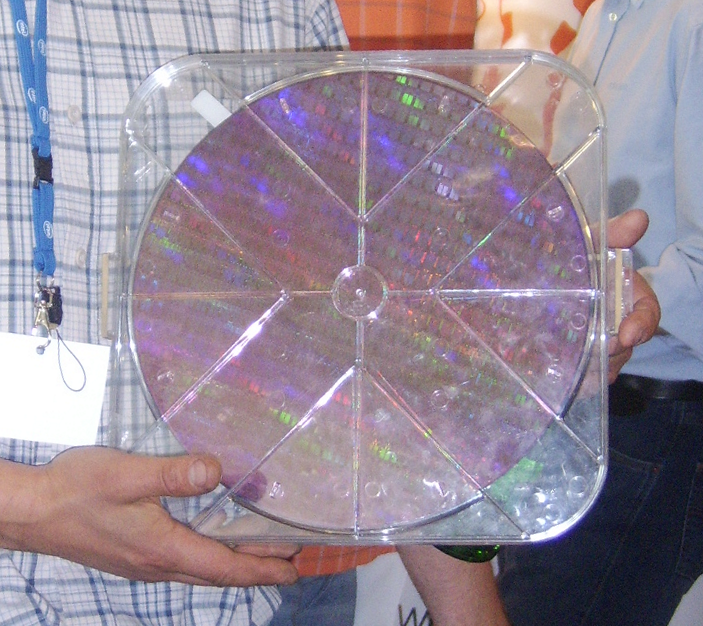
VLSI devices fabricated by Intel on a monocrystalline silicon wafer

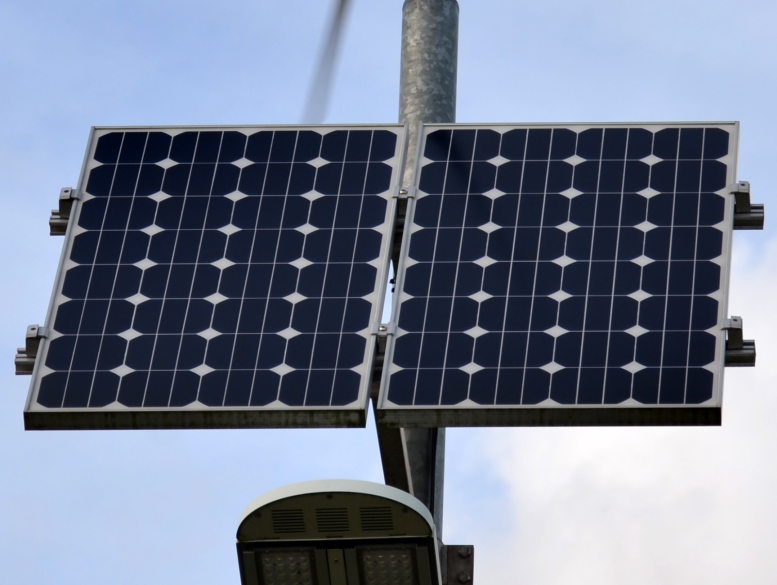
Solar panel made of octagonal monocrystalline silicon cells

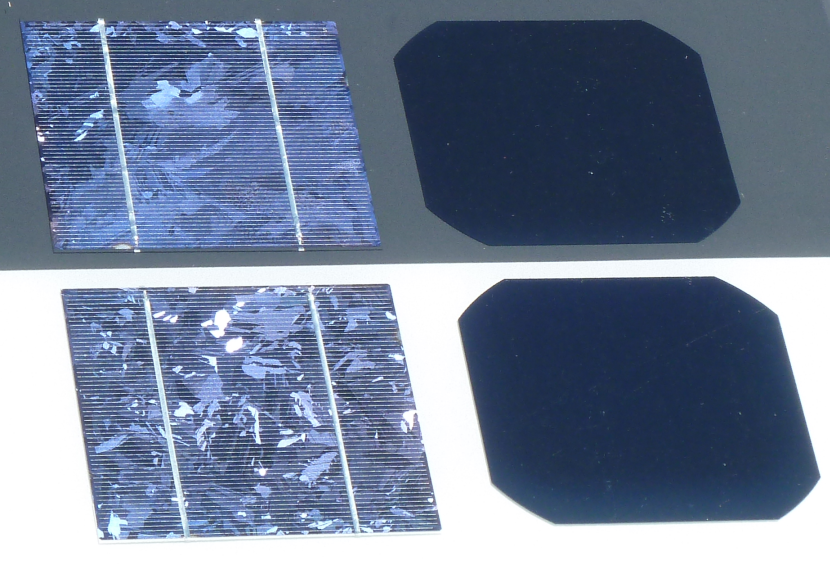
Comparison of solar cells: poly-Si (left) and mono-Si (right)
