= Xunlight Corporation =

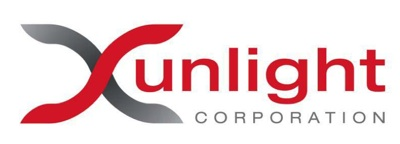
- Type: Private
- Founded: 2002 (as Midwest Optoelectronics, LLC)
- Fate: Manufactured in Kunshan, China
- Headquarters: Suzhou, China, CN
- Website: http://www.xunlightchina.com

Xunlight Corporation was a technology company that specialized in the development of high-performance, flexible, and lightweight solar modules. Xunlight used a high-speed roll-to-roll manufacturing process to develop thin-film silicon-based photovoltaic solutions. In 2014, the company filed for bankruptcy.

== History ==
The company was established in January 2002 as Midwest Optoelectronics, LLC (MWOE) by Xunming Deng, a University of Toledo's physics professor and, his wife, Liwei Xu. The company was given license to technology developed at the University of Toledo's Thin Film Silicon Photovoltaic Laboratory.

In May 2003, MWOE receives its first grant from United States Department of Energy's Small Business Innovation Research.

In January 2006, MWOE and UT reach an exclusive license agreement for four sets of technology portfolios developed in the Thin Film Silicon Photovoltaic Laboratory.

In April 2006, Xunlight was formed and all MWOE operations were reorganized into Xunlight.

In May 2007, Xunlight receives Series A investment of $7 million. In July, Xunlight moves its headquarters from the incubator at the University of Toledo to a 122,000 sq. ft. manufacturing facility at 3145 Nebraska Ave. By September, Xunlight received another $3 million in government funding which included a $1.9 million grant from the National Institute of Standards and Technology. Two months later, the Lucas County announced that it would make a $2 million investment in Xunlight.

In April 2008, Xunlight receives Series B investment of $33 million. In June, Xunlight receives $5 million grant from Ohio Department of Development. Xunlight demonstrates first solar cell deposition on 2MW roll-to-roll pilot production line. In December, Xunlight receives $7 million loan from the State of Ohio.

In June 2009, Xunlight successfully completes the installation and demonstration of its 25MW high-throughput, wide-web, roll-to-roll photovoltaic manufacturing process. Xunlight (Kunshan) Co., Ltd is established as Xunlight`s China factory. In September, Xunlight delivers and installs its first shipment of solar modules to its first customer, the University of Toledo.
