= Cadmium telluride photovoltaics =

Type of solar power cell

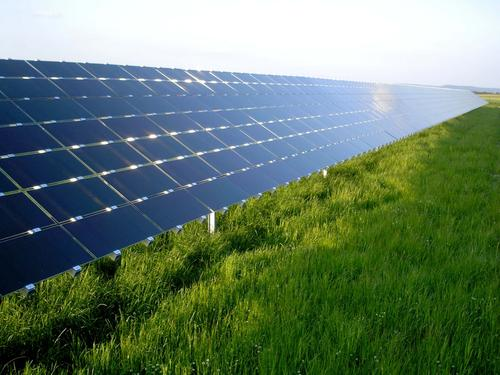
PV array made of cadmium telluride (CdTe) solar panels

Cadmium telluride (CdTe) photovoltaics is a photovoltaic (PV) technology based on the use of cadmium telluride in a thin semiconductor layer designed to absorb and convert sunlight into electricity. Cadmium telluride PV is the only thin film technology with lower costs than conventional solar cells made of crystalline silicon in multi-kilowatt systems.

On a lifecycle basis, CdTe PV has the smallest carbon footprint, lowest water use and shortest energy payback time of any current photovoltaic technology. CdTe's energy payback time of less than a year allows for faster carbon reductions without short-term energy deficits.

The toxicity of cadmium is an environmental concern during production and when the panels are disposed of. Some of this might be mitigated by recycling of CdTe modules at the end of their life time, as there are uncertainties regarding the recycling of CdTe modules and the public opinion is skeptical towards this technology. The usage of rare materials may also become a limiting factor to the industrial scalability of CdTe technology in the mid-term future. The abundance of tellurium—of which telluride is the anionic form—is comparable to that of platinum in the Earth's crust and contributes significantly to the module's cost.

CdTe photovoltaics are used in some of the world's largest photovoltaic power stations, such as the Topaz Solar Farm. With a share of 5.1% of worldwide PV production, CdTe technology accounted for more than half of the thin film market in 2013.

== Background ==
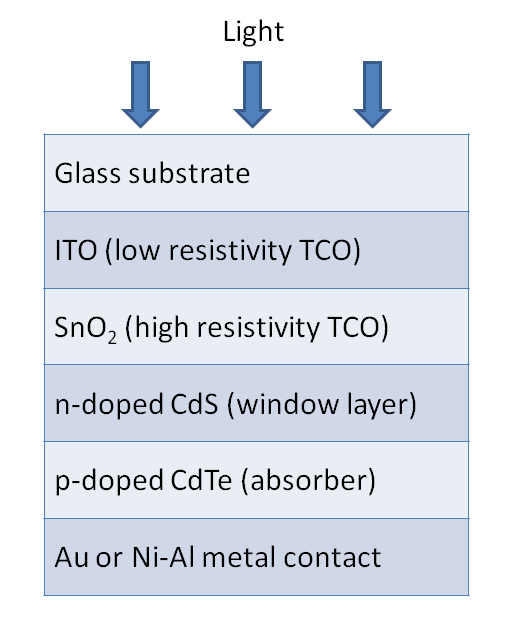
Cross-section of a CdTe thin film solar cell.

The dominant PV technology has always been based on crystalline silicon wafers. Thin films and concentrators were early attempts to lower costs. Thin films are based on using thinner semiconductor layers to absorb and convert sunlight. Concentrators lower the number of panels by using lenses or mirrors to put more sunlight on each panel.

The first thin film technology to be extensively developed was amorphous silicon. However, this technology suffers from low efficiencies and slow deposition rates (leading to high capital costs). Instead, the PV market reached some 4 gigawatts in 2007 with crystalline silicon comprising almost 90% of sales. The same source estimated that about 3 gigawatts were installed in 2007.

During this period cadmium telluride and copper indium diselenide or CIS-alloys remained under development. The latter is beginning to be produced in volumes of 1–30 megawatts per year due to very high small-area cell efficiencies approaching 20% in the laboratory. CdTe cell efficiency is approaching 20% in the laboratory with a record of 22.1% as of 2016.

== History ==
Research in CdTe dates back to the 1950s, because its band gap (~1.5 eV) is almost a perfect match to the distribution of photons in the solar spectrum in terms of conversion to electricity. A simple heterojunction design evolved in which p-type CdTe was matched with n-type cadmium sulfide (CdS). The cell was completed by adding top and bottom contacts. Early leaders in CdS/CdTe cell efficiencies were GE in the 1960s, and then Kodak, Monosolar, Matsushita, and AMETEK.

By 1981, Kodak used close-space sublimation (CSS) and made the first 10% efficient cells and first multi-cell devices (12 cells, 8% efficiency, 30 cm^{2}). Monosolar and AMETEK used electrodeposition, a popular early method. Matsushita started with screen printing but shifted in the 1990s to CSS. Cells of about 10% sunlight-to-electricity efficiency were produced by the early 1980s at Kodak, Matsushita, Monosolar and AMETEK.

An important step forward occurred when cells were scaled-up in size to make larger area products called modules. These products required higher currents than small cells and it was found that an additional layer, called a transparent conducting oxide (TCO), could facilitate the movement of current across the top of the cell (instead of a metal grid). One such TCO, tin oxide, was available for other uses (thermally reflective windows). Made more conductive for PV, tin oxide became and remains the norm in CdTe PV modules.

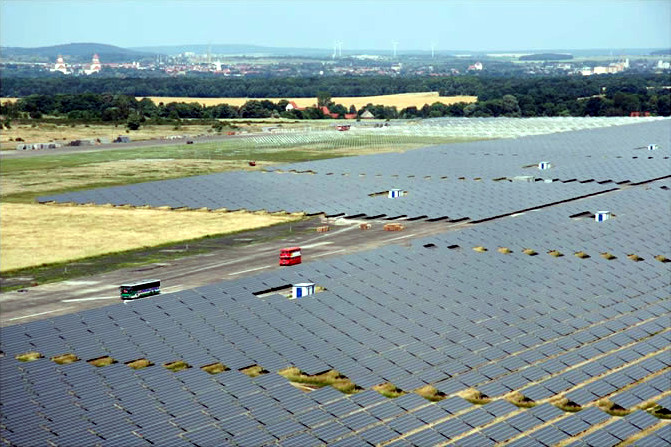
The utility-scale Waldpolenz Solar Park in Germany uses CdTe PV modules

CdTe cells achieved above 15% efficiency in 1992 by adding a buffer layer to the TCO/CdS/CdTe stack and then thinned the CdS to admit more light. Chu used resistive tin oxide as the buffer layer and then thinned the CdS from several micrometres to under half a micrometre in thickness. Thick CdS, as it was used in prior devices, blocked about 5 mA/cm^{2} of light, or about 20% of the light usable by a CdTe device. The additional layer did not compromise the device's other properties.

In the early 1990s, other players experienced mixed results. Golden Photon held the record for a short period for the best CdTe module measured at NREL at 7.7% using a spray deposition technique. Matsushita claimed an 11% module efficiency using CSS and then dropped the technology. A similar efficiency and fate eventually occurred at BP Solar. BP used electrodeposition (inherited from Monosolar by a circuitous route when it purchased SOHIO, Monosolar's acquirer). BP Solar dropped CdTe in November 2002. Antec was able to make about 7%-efficient modules, but went bankrupt when it started producing commercially during a short, sharp market downturn in 2002. However, as of 2014 Antec still made CdTe PV modules.

CdTe start-ups include Calyxo (formerly owned by Q-Cells), PrimeStar Solar, in Arvada, Colorado (acquired by First Solar from GE), Arendi (Italy). Including Antec, their total production represents less than 70 megawatts per year. Empa, the Swiss Federal Laboratories for Materials Testing and Research, focuses on the development of CdTe solar cells on flexible substrates and demonstrated cell efficiencies of 13.5% and 15.6% for flexible plastic foil and glass substrates, respectively.

=== SCI and First Solar ===
The major commercial success was by Solar Cells Incorporated (SCI). Its founder, Harold McMaster, envisioned low-cost thin films made on a large scale. After trying amorphous silicon, he shifted to CdTe at the urging of Jim Nolan and founded Solar Cells Inc., which later became First Solar. McMaster championed CdTe for its high-rate, high-throughput processing. In February 1999, McMaster sold the company to True North Partners, who named it First Solar.

In its early years First Solar suffered setbacks, and initial module efficiencies were modest, about 7%. Commercial product became available in 2002. Production reached 25 megawatts in 2005. The company manufactured in Perrysburg, Ohio and Germany. In 2013, First Solar acquired GE's thin film solar panel technology in exchange for a 1.8% stake in the company. Today, First Solar manufactures over 3 gigawatts with an average module efficiency of 16.4% in 2016.

First Solar notably uses a high-rate vapor transport deposition process in lieu of CSS (closed space sublimation) for the deposition of CdTe. This is a type of physical vapor deposition where CdTe is first sublimated in an upstream region. Then, the Cd and Te_{2} gases flow across a cooler downstream region where they condense on a substrate to form solid CdTe. This process is preferred over CSS because it produces films of greater uniformity and allows for deposition on any configuration of the substrate.

== Technology ==
=== Cell efficiency ===
Solar cell efficiencies

In August 2014 First Solar announced a device with 21.1% conversion efficiency. In February 2016, First Solar announced that they had reached a record 22.1% conversion efficiency in their CdTe cells. In 2014, the record module efficiency was also raised by First Solar from 16.1% up to 17.0%. At this time, the company projected average production line module efficiency for its CdTe PV to be 17% by 2017, but by 2016, they predicted a module efficiency closer to ~19.5%.

To reach these record high efficiencies of 22%, alloying is used for band gap grading. A compound incorporating selenium into CdTe is used in the solar cell to improve the quantum efficiency response for certain wavelengths of light, in addition to unalloyed CdTe. The other major contributor to this large increase in efficiency is the usage of MgZnO (MZO) within the cell. In a cell using a CdSe_{x}Te_{1−x}/CdTe structure, MZO can be used in place of CdS. CdS is source of inefficient absorption, while MZO has a tunable band gap that can be optimized for high transparency and good alignment with CdSe_{x}Te_{1−x}.

=== Process optimization ===
Process optimization improved throughput and lowered costs. Improvements included broader substrates (since capital costs scale sublinearly and installation costs can be reduced), thinner layers (to save material, electricity, and processing time), and better material utilization (to save material and cleaning costs). 2014 CdTe module costs were about $72 per 1 square metre (11 sq ft), or about $90 per module.

=== Ambient temperature ===
Module efficiencies are measured in laboratories at standard testing temperatures of 25 °C, however in the field modules are often exposed to much higher temperatures. CdTe's relatively low temperature coefficient protects performance at higher temperatures. CdTe PV modules experience half the reduction of crystalline silicon modules, resulting in an increased annual energy output of 5-9%.

=== Solar tracking ===
Almost all thin film photovoltaic module systems to-date have been non-solar tracking, because module output was too low to offset tracker capital and operating costs. But relatively inexpensive single-axis tracking systems can add 25% to output. In addition, depending on the Tracker Energy Gain, the overall eco-efficiency of the PV system can be enhanced by lowering both system costs and environmental impacts. This is climate-dependent. Tracking also produces a smoother output plateau around midday, better matching afternoon peaks.

== Materials ==
=== Cadmium ===
Cadmium (Cd), a toxic heavy metal considered a hazardous substance, is a waste byproduct of mining, smelting and refining sulfidic ores of zinc during zinc refining, and therefore its production does not depend on PV market demand. CdTe PV modules provide a beneficial and safe use for cadmium that would otherwise be stored for future use or disposed of in landfills as hazardous waste. Mining byproducts can be converted into a stable CdTe compound and safely encapsulated inside CdTe PV solar modules for years. A large growth in the CdTe PV sector has the potential to reduce global carbon emissions by displacing coal and oil power generation.

=== Tellurium ===
Tellurium (Te) production and reserves estimates are subject to uncertainty and vary considerably. Tellurium is a rare, mildly toxic metalloid that is primarily used as a machining additive to steel. Te is almost exclusively obtained as a by-product of copper refining, with smaller amounts from lead and gold production. Only a small amount, estimated to be about 800 metric tons per year, is available. According to USGS, global production in 2007 was 135 metric tons. One gigawatt (GW) of CdTe PV modules would require about 93 metric tons (at current efficiencies and thicknesses). Through improved material efficiency and increased PV recycling, the CdTe PV industry has the potential to fully rely on tellurium from recycled end-of-life modules by 2038. In the last decade, new supplies have been located, e.g., in Xinju, China as well as in Mexico and Sweden. In 1984 astrophysicists identified tellurium as the universe's most abundant element having an atomic number over 40. Certain undersea ridges are rich in tellurium.

=== Cadmium chloride/magnesium chloride ===
The manufacture of a CdTe cell includes a thin coating with cadmium chloride (CdCl_{2}) to increase the cell's overall efficiency. Cadmium chloride is toxic, relatively expensive and highly soluble in water, posing a potential environmental threat during manufacture. In 2014 research discovered that abundant and harmless magnesium chloride (MgCl_{2}) performs as well as cadmium chloride. This research may lead to cheaper and safer CdTe cells.

=== Safety ===
By themselves, cadmium and tellurium are toxic and carcinogenic, but CdTe forms a crystalline lattice that is highly stable, and is several orders of magnitude less toxic than cadmium. The glass plates surrounding CdTe material sandwiched between them (as in all commercial modules) seal during a fire and do not allow any cadmium release unless the glass is broken. All other uses and exposures related to cadmium are minor and similar in kind and magnitude to exposures from other materials in the broader PV value chain, e.g., to toxic gases, lead solder, or solvents (most of which are not used in CdTe manufacturing).

=== Grain boundaries ===
The grain boundary is the interface between two grains of a crystalline material and occur when two grains meet. They are a type of crystalline defect. It is often assumed that the open-circuit voltage gap seen in CdTe, in comparison to both single-crystal GaAs and the theoretical limit, may be in some way attributable to the grain boundaries within the material. There have however been a number of studies which have suggested not only that GBs are not deleterious to performance but may in fact be beneficial as sources of enhanced carrier collection. So, the exact role of the grain boundaries in limitation of performance of CdTe-based solar cells remains unclear and the research is ongoing to address this question. However, in as-grown CdTe, grain boundaries are detrimental to performance. Subsequent processing may change this, but those effects should be studied on a case-by-case basis.

The size of the grains, and thus, the number of grain boundaries in a CdTe film are dependent on substrate temperature during film deposition. The higher the substrate temperature is, the larger the grain size, and the fewer the number of grain boundaries in the film. If a low substrate temperature is used during deposition, grain size is commonly increased by depositing CdCl_{2} on the film and subsequently annealing. This is a crucial processing step, as cells deposited at low temperatures that lack this step are unable to reach conversion efficiencies above 10%.

== Recycling ==
Photovoltaic modules can last anywhere from 25 – 30 years. Improper disposal of PV modules can release toxic materials into the environment. Only three methods of high-value recycling are industrially available for thin-film PV modules, as of 2013. SENSE (Sustainability EvaluatioN of Solar Energy systems) and RESOLVED (REcovery of SOLar Valuable materials, Enrichment, and Decontamination) are European funded procedures. SENSE relies on mechanical, chemical and thermal treatments. RESOLVED relies on mainly mechanical treatments. The final method, First Solar, relies on mechanical and chemical processes. Mechanical methods of recycling are more environmentally friendly as they do not rely on the use of chemicals.

Materials that can be recovered in the recycling process include metals, mounts, glass, and, in high value cases, the whole PV module.

As of 2013 the recycling costs for CdTe modules are higher than the re-sale of recycled materials. However, possible future recycling methods may decrease in cost through reduction of expensive and environmentally unfriendly processes. Promising future recycling methods include vulcanization-vacuum distillation and the Double Green Process. Vulcanization-vacuum distillation has been suggested as a possible recycling process to obtain Te and can recover Te with purities up to 99.92%. The Double Green Process consists of almost entirely mechanical processes.

Due to the exponential growth of photovoltaics the number of worldwide installed PV systems has increased significantly. First Solar established the first global and comprehensive recycling program in the PV industry in 2005. Its recycling facilities operate at each of First Solar's manufacturing plants and recover up to 95% of semiconductor material for reuse in new modules and 90% of glass for reuse in new glass products. A life-cycle assessment of CdTe module recycling by the University of Stuttgart showed a reduction in primary energy demand in End-Of-Life from 81 MJ/m^{2} to -12 MJ/m^{2}, a reduction of around 93 MJ/m^{2}, and in terms of global warming potential from 6 kg CO_{2}-equiv./m^{2} to -2.5 CO_{2}-equiv./m^{2}, a reduction of around -8.5 CO_{2}-equiv./m^{2}. These reductions show a highly beneficial change in the overall environmental profile of CdTe photovoltaic module. The LCA also showed that the main contributors to considered environmental impact categories are due to required chemicals and energy within the processing of CdTe modules.

== Environmental and health impact ==
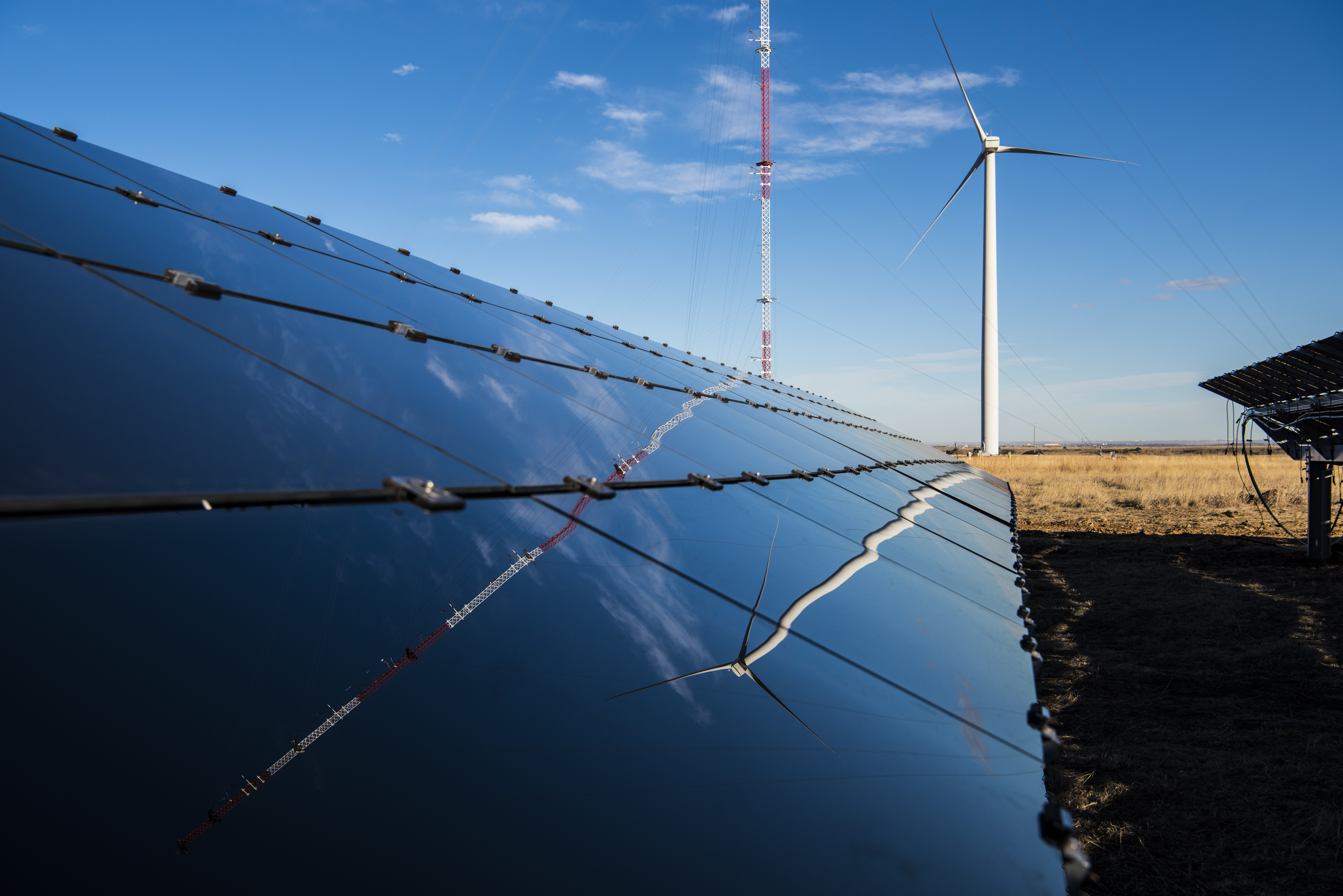
A small PV array used as part of Energy Systems Integration research ongoing at the National Wind Technology Center (NWTC)

Photovoltaics can assist in reducing toxic emissions and pollution caused by fossil fuels. Emissions from fossil fuels that impact global climates such as nitrogen oxides (NO_{x}), carbon dioxide (CO_{2}) and sulfur dioxide (SO_{2}) are not emitted from PV. A single gigawatt-hour of electricity produced from PV would decrease the emissions of SO_{2} by 10 tons, NO_{x} by 4 tons and CO_{2} by 1000 tons when compared to coal.

Cadmium telluride photovoltaic cells have negative impacts on both workers and the ecosystem. When inhaled or ingested the materials of CdTe cells are considered to be both toxic and carcinogenic by the US Occupational Safety and Health Administration. Workers in processing facilities may be exposed to, and inhale, fine particles or fumes of Cd.

CdTe production facilities may cause environmental issues when there are accidents in high-efficiency production or from by-product exhaust in less efficient production methods.

During a module's lifespan it will not release any particles or vapors if used as intended. The only way for a completed module to release dust or vapor is by being ignited, or ground into a fine dust. When exposed to temperatures of approximately 1100 °C in laboratory tests, 0.4% to 0.6% of the Cd content was released.

The overall Cd air emission estimates can range from 0.02 to 0.5 grams per gigawatt-hour.

Early CdTe modules failed elution tests, however more recent models can pass some elution tests. Despite the small amounts of Cd that may leach out, CdTe modules have low overall leachability as the hazardous materials within them are encased within two layers of glass. CdTe modules have very poor biodegradability.

== Market viability ==
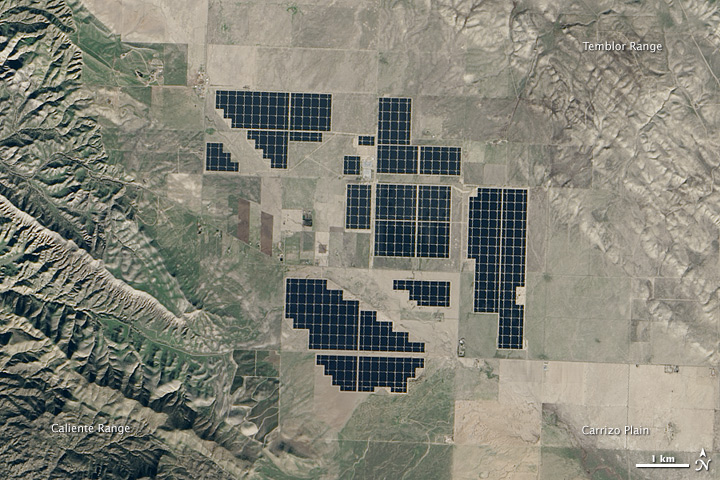
The Topaz Solar Farm employs 9 million CdTe-modules. It was the world's largest PV power station in 2014.

Success of cadmium telluride PV has been due to the low cost achievable with the CdTe technology, made possible by combining adequate efficiency with lower module area costs. Direct manufacturing cost for CdTe PV modules reached $0.57 per watt in 2013, and capital cost per new watt of capacity was about $0.9 per watt (including land and buildings) in 2008.

=== Notable systems ===
Utility-scale CdTe PV solutions were claimed to be able to compete with peaking fossil fuel generation sources depending on irradiance levels, interest rates and other factors such as development costs. Recent installations of large First Solar CdTe PV systems were claimed to be competitive with other forms of solar energy:

- First Solar's 290-megawatt (MW) Agua Caliente project in Arizona is one of the largest photovoltaic power station ever built. Agua Caliente features First Solar's plant control, forecasting and energy scheduling capabilities that contribute to grid reliability and stability.
- The 550 MW Topaz Solar Farm in California, finished construction in November 2014 and was the world's largest solar farm at the time.
- First Solar's 13 MW project in Dubai, operated by the Dubai Electricity and Water Authority, is the first part of the Mohammed bin Rashid Al Maktoum Solar Park, and was the region's largest PV power plant at the time of completion in 2013.
- A 40 MW system installed by Juwi group in Waldpolenz Solar Park, Germany was, at the time of its announcement in 2007, the world's largest and lowest cost planned PV system. The price was 130 million euros.
- A 128 MWp system installed by Belectric at Templin, Brandenburg, Germany is the current largest thin-film PV installation in Europe (as of January 2015).
- For the 21 MW Blythe Photovoltaic Power Plant in California, a power purchase agreement fixed the price for the generated electricity at $0.12 per kWh (after the application of all incentives). Defined in California as the "Market Referent Price," this set the price the PUC would pay for any daytime peaking power source, e.g., natural gas. Although PV systems are intermittent and not dispatchable the way natural gas is, natural gas generators have an ongoing fuel price risk that PV does not have.
- A contract for two megawatts of rooftop installations with Southern California Edison. The SCE program is designed to install 250 MW at a total cost of $875M (averaging $3.5/watt), after incentives.

== See also ==
- Abound Solar
- Cadmium telluride
- Copper indium gallium selenide (CIGS).
- Energy harvesting
- First Solar
- High efficiency solar cells
- Low cost solar cell
- Renewable energy
- Solar cell
- Solar energy
- Solar panel
- Thin film solar cell
