= Abound Solar =

Defunct Colorado solar panel manufacturer

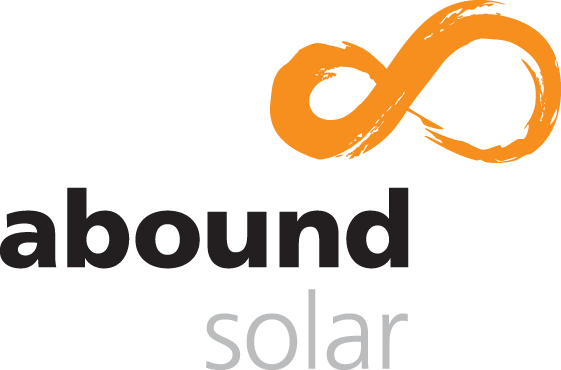
- Type: Private
- Industry: Solar Energy
- Founded: 2007
- Founders: Dr. W.S. Sampath, Al Enzenroth, Kurt Barth
- Headquarters: Loveland, Colorado, U.S.
- Key people: Craig Witsoe (CEO)
- Products: Solar panels
- Website: n/a

Abound Solar was a manufacturer of cadmium telluride modules–a thin-film photovoltaic technology–based in the United States. It operated a production facility in Longmont, Colorado. The company was incorporated as AVA Solar in 2007 and was rebranded as Abound Solar in March 2009. In 2012, the company laid off almost half its employees before suspending operations and filing for bankruptcy.

== History ==
Abound Solar's founders began researching thin-film deposition since the late 1980s. In 1991, W.S. Sampath, a professor at Colorado State University, patented a process for low-cost metal deposition within a vacuum. Al Enzenroth, Kurt Barth, Professor Sampath settled upon cadmium telluride (CdTe) as the ideal photovoltaic material for low-cost solar module production.

By 1998, the team had developed a pilot production process featuring an inline, single-vacuum semiconductor deposition tool. Over the course of the next few years, the team continued to develop and refine the technology with strong support from the National Renewable Energy Laboratory (NREL) and the National Science Foundation.

By 2004, the founding team had scaled up the technology glass panels of 16 by 16 inches (410 by 410 mm) in size. Federal funding from NREL and the Solar America Initiative enabled them to prove the viability of the technology. In 2006, AVA Solar, Inc. was formed with private funding from local angel investors to commercialize the technology.

In early 2007, institutional investors discovered the company and the proprietary manufacturing process that had been developed. Abound received a $400 million in loan guarantee from the U.S. Department of Energy in 2010.

In 2012 the company laid off almost half its employees. On June 28, 2012, Abound Solar announced that it would suspend operations and file for bankruptcy protection. Abound filed for bankruptcy in July 2012.

== Technology ==
Abound Solar produced cadmium telluride thin-film solar modules using a proprietary closed-space sublimation technology developed at Colorado State University.

== Production ==
In April 2008, Abound Solar took possession of a Longmont, Colorado-area building previously used by Applied Films. Within weeks preparations were made to renovate the facility and construct the largest thin-film solar module manufacturing facility in the United States.

== Environmental controversy ==
In February 2013, the Colorado Department of Public Health and Environment (CDPHE) issued a compliance advisory (an "informal enforcement action") to the company, requiring that it clean up some 2,000 "unsellable" pallets of solar panels containing cadmium, a toxic carcinogen, as well as drums of cadmium-contaminated fluids. The bankruptcy trustee for the company estimated the cost of the cleanup to be $2.2 million. In July 2013, the Denver Post reported that the cleanup of the hazardous materials had been completed. It also reported that over 70,000 leftover solar panels, which were found to be viable, were shipped to a company called Best Safety Glass in Singapore.

== See also ==
- CdTe photovoltaics
