= Methylammonium tin halide =

Crystal structure

CH_{3}NH_{3}SnX_{3} crystal structure

Methylammonium tin halides are solid compounds with perovskite structure and a chemical formula of CH_{3}NH_{3}SnX_{3}, where X = I, Br or Cl. They are promising lead-free alternatives to lead perovskites as photoactive semiconductor materials. Tin-based perovskites have shown excellent mobility in transistors which gives them an opportunity to be explored more for solar cell applications.

Tin halide perovskites, despite being regarded as semiconductors, often display metallic-like behavior due to the inadvertent and/or spontaneous hole carrier doping resulting from the easy oxidation of Sn^{2+} to Sn^{4+}.

== See also ==
- Perovskite solar cell
- Methylammonium halide
- Methylammonium lead halide
- Tin-based perovskite solar cells
