= Inkjet solar cell =

Inkjet solar cells are solar cells manufactured by low-cost, high tech methods that use an inkjet printer to lay down the semiconductor material and the electrodes onto a solar cell substrate.

This approach is being developed independently at various locations including the University of New South Wales, Oregon State University, Massachusetts Institute of Technology, and Saule Technologies Although inkjet printed solar cells were not a major focus previously due to their relatively low efficiencies, the appearance of perovskite solar cells, has led to a renewed interest in the development of inkjet printed solar cells, due to their nature of being solution processable. Perovskite solar cells currently are up to an efficiency of 25.2%, and fully inkjet printed perovskite solar cells have been shown to be able to have over 17% stabilized power conversion efficiency (SPCE).

== History ==
The first case of printed electronics was seen in 1903 when Albert Hanson filed a patent for "printed" wire. After that the radio drove the industry of printed electronics forward. Until recently inkjet printers have not been used in the printed electronics industry. Industry has decided to move towards inkjet printing because of its low cost and flexibility of use. One of these used is the inkjet solar cell. The first instance of constructing a solar cell with an inkjet printer was by Konarka in 2008. In 2011 Oregon State University was able to discover a way to create CIGS solar cells using an inkjet printer. In the same year MIT was able to create a solar cell using an inkjet printer on paper. The use of an inkjet printer to make solar cells is very new and is still being researched. In 2014, Olga Malinkiewicz presented her inkjet printing manufacturing process for perovskite sheets in Boston (USA) during the MRS fall meeting - for which she received MIT Technology review's innovators under 35 award.

== How they are made ==
In general inkjet solar cells are made by using an inkjet printer to put down the semiconductor material and electrodes onto a solar cell substrate. Both organic and inorganic solar cells can be made using the inkjet method. Inkjet printed inorganic solar cells used to be CIGS solar cells. The organic solar cells are polymer solar cells. The inkjet printing of hybrid perovskite solar cells is also possible, and is now a primary focus. Inkjet printing is even being explored as a method to add the other cell components to silicon based solar cells.The most important component of the ink is the functional material: a metal salt mixture (CIGS), a polymer fullerene blend (polymer solar cells) or a precursor of mixed organic and inorganic salts (perovskite solar cells). These components are dissolved in an appropriate solvent. Additional components might be added to affect the viscosity and the surface tension of the ink for improved printability and wetting on the substrate. The ink is contained in a cartridge from where it is transferred onto a substrate which can vary. The printing is accomplished usually by a piezoelectric driver in the nozzles of the printhead, that is programmed to apply pre-set patterns of pressure to eject droplets. In most cases several layers of functional materials are deposited on top of each other to generate a working solar cell. The entire printing process can be done in ambient conditions, though in most cases further heat treatments are needed. Important factors for the efficiency of inkjet printed organic solar cells are the inkjet latency time, the inkjet printing table temperature, and the effect of the chemical properties of the polymer donor.

=== Advantages ===
The main advantage to printing solar cells with an inkjet printer is the low cost of production. The reason it is cheaper than other methods is because no vacuum is necessary which makes the equipment cheaper. Also, the ink is a low cost metal salt blend reducing the cost of the solar cells. There is very little waste of material in comparison to other methods like vapor phase deposition when using inkjet printers to lay down the semiconductor material. This is because the printer is able to create precise patterning with little waste.

=== Issues ===
The primary issue with inkjet printed solar cells is not actually with the cells themselves, but making sure that the manufacturing is optimized, such as the inks for printing and the drying processes; this requires the control and optimization of multiple variables, such as the "viscosity, volatility, and surface tension" which can be modified by changing the solvent and modifying the solute. Additionally, there are concerns with the toxicity of both the solvents that are used and the semiconductor materials for the solar cells which are being used.

=== Inkjet Printing for Silicon Solar Cells ===
Inkjet printing is being explored as a deposition technique for the electrode layers for silicon solar cells. Silicon solar cells require front conductive contacts (usually Ag) in order to assist in current flow and maximize the efficiency of the cell. This does present a compromise between shading parts of the surface of the cell and improving current flow. Although the use of inkjet printing for the deposition of this silver conductive grid has so far resulted in lower cell efficiencies than other deposition techniques, it is beneficial because it allows for the creation of an incredibly precise grid of any pattern without the need for complex and more wasteful manufacturing techniques such as lithography or etching.

Another major technique that can be used to reduce optical losses (increase light absorption) in solar cells is to create surface texture, because it reduces reflection losses. Although it can increase efficiency dramatically, this texturizing is not usually used because of the more complicated and costly manufacturing techniques that would then be required, such as photolithography. However, inkjet printing offers a chance to make this easier and therefore more accessible, because a patterned mask could be printed onto the surface which could then be etched (perhaps using a solution).

=== Inkjet Printing for Copper Indium Gallium Selenide Solar Cell (CIGS) ===
Inkjet printing techniques have been explored for the manufacturing of thin-film CIGS solar cells, and are of particular interest due to the extremely low waste from material deposition. Sputtering techniques are often used to deposit the CIGS layer in these cells which is a relatively low-waste technique; however, inkjet printing offers an even lower waste option by allowing for the deposition of the material in only the exact desired locations on the surface that is being coated. Reducing waste in the production process of CIGS cells is important because the costs of the light absorbing layer's components (copper, indium, gallium, and selenide) is comparatively much higher than other types of solar cells, mainly due to the rarity of In, Ga, and Se. CIGS solar panels are appealing mainly because they function as a thin film solar cell (and so require much less materials) and they have a similar efficiency (23.6%) compared to the traditional crystalline silicon solar panels (26.7%) although CIGS solar cells tend to realistically operate at higher efficiencies than their Si counterparts. Inkjet printing methods can also offer a more environmentally friendly option, because it does not require the use of toxic chemicals to prepare the solar cell like other methods do. Inkjet printing is also being explored for use in depositing the front contact layer for CIGS cells.

=== Inkjet Printing for Perovskite Solar Cells ===
There is a major focus on the composition of the perovskites that are used in any of the types of solar cells. A major focus in current research on perovskite solar cells is how to make them safer, based on toxicity concerns with the materials that are used in perovskites and the solvents that are used for deposition. This focus on producing safer materials is also a major focus for perovskite solar cell research more broadly. In the case of manufacturing controls for perovskite inkjet printing, it is also important to control factors such as the perovskites' composition and particle size.

== Potential ==
Inkjet printed solar cells have an incredible potential, despite their efficiency being lower than more common solar cell materials, because of the ease with which they can be manufactured. They can be printed in ambient conditions, and require relatively low annealing temperatures. By improving "ink engineering", these solar cells can present an excellent avenue for advancing solar cell technology.

In traditional solar cells the material that holds the photovoltaic material generally costs more than the material itself. With inkjet printing, it is possible to print solar cells on paper. This may allow solar cells to be cheaper and be placed almost anywhere. Paper thin solar cells or, eventually, direct 3D printing may allow to create solar cells on blinds, in windows, in curtains, and almost anywhere in the home.

== See also ==
- Perovskite solar cell
- CIGS solar cell
- Organic solar cell
