= Tsutomu Miyasaka =

Japanese chemist

- Born: 宮坂 力 September 10, 1953 (age 73); Kamakura, Kanagawa Prefecture, Japan
- Education: Waseda University (BSc); University of Tokyo (MSc, PhD)
- Known for: Perovskite solar cell
- Awards: Clarivate Citation Laureates (2017); Asahi Prize (2023); Japan Academy Prize (2024)
- Scientific career
- Fields: Electrochemistry
- Workplaces: Toin University of Yokohama
- Doctoral advisor: Kenichi Honda

Tsutomu Miyasaka (宮坂力, Miyasaka Tsutomu; born September 10, 1953), is a Japanese engineer in electrochemistry best known as the inventor of the perovskite solar cell.

== Education ==
Miyasaka graduated from the Applied Chemistry Department of Waseda University in March 1976. He obtained a master's degree in industrial chemistry from the University of Tokyo (UTokyo) in 1978. He was a visiting researcher at the University of Quebec in Canada in 1980 when he was study Ph.D. in synthetic chemistry at the UTokyo.

== Career ==
Miyasaka joined Fujifilm after completing his PhD in March 1981, he worked on the development of high-sensitivity films for photo camera films for instant cameras and the development of lithium-ion battery. However, Fujifilm has discontinued development of lithium-ion battery due to "impossible to make a profit". After being recruited, he became a professor at Graduate School of Engineering at Toin University of Yokohama in 2001.

Meantime in 2004, in response to the promotion of the venture company's founding policy by the mayor of Yokohama City, Miyasaka established Peccell Technologies for solar cell research and served as the representative director until 2009.

He also developed the first photocapacitor.

Since 2009, Miyasaka has been working on research and development of perovskite solar cell, therefore, he won the Clarivate Citation Laureates in 2017. In 2017 Miyasaka was awarded the Hamakawa award for his contribution in photovoltaic science and technology development.

== Recognition ==
- 2017 - Clarivate Citation Laureates
- 2020 - Yamazaki-Teiichi Prize
- 2022 - Rank Prizes
- 2023 - Asahi Prize
- 2024 - Japan Academy Prize
- 2025 - Asian Scientist 100
- 2026 - Kyoto Prize
- 2026 - Person of Cultural Merit

== Selected publications ==
- K. Koyama, I. Itoh: Quantum conversion and image detection by a bacteriorhodopsin-based artificial photoreceptor. In: Science. Band 255, 1992, S. 342–344
- Y. Idota, T. Kubota, A. Matsufuji, Y. Maekawa: Tin-based amorphous oxide. A high-capacity lithium-ion-storage material. In: Science. Band 276, 1997, S. 1395–1397
- A. Kojima, K. Teshima, Y. Shirai: Organometal halide perovskites as visible-light sensitizers for photovoltaic cells. In: Journal of the American Chemical Society. Band 131, 2009, S. 6050–6051. https://pubs.acs.org/doi/abs/10.1021/ja809598r
- M. M. Lee, J. Teuscher, T. N. Murakami, H. J. Snaith: Efficient hybrid solar cells based on meso-superstructured organometal halide perovskites. In: Science. Band 338, 2012, S. 643–647.
- T. Singh, T. Miyasaka: "Stabilizing the efficiency beyond 20% with a mixed cation perovskite solar cell fabricated in ambient air under controlled humidity." In: "Advanced Energy Materials." 8(3), 2018, 1700677.https://onlinelibrary.wiley.com/doi/abs/10.1002/aenm.201700677
- T. Singh, M. Ikegami, T. Miyasaka: Ambient Fabrication of 126 μm Thick Complete Perovskite Photovoltaic Device for High Flexibility and Performance. In: ACS Applied Energy Materials. 1(12), 2018, 6741–6747. https://pubs.acs.org/doi/abs/10.1021/acsaem.8b01623
- T. Singh, S. Oez: Sulfate‐Assisted Interfacial Engineering for High Yield and Efficiency of Triple Cation Perovskite Solar Cells with Alkali‐Doped TiO2 Electron‐Transporting Layers. In: Advanced Functional Materials. 28, 2018, 1706287.https://onlinelibrary.wiley.com/doi/full/10.1002/adfm.201706287
