= Methylammonium lead halide =

Class of chemical compounds

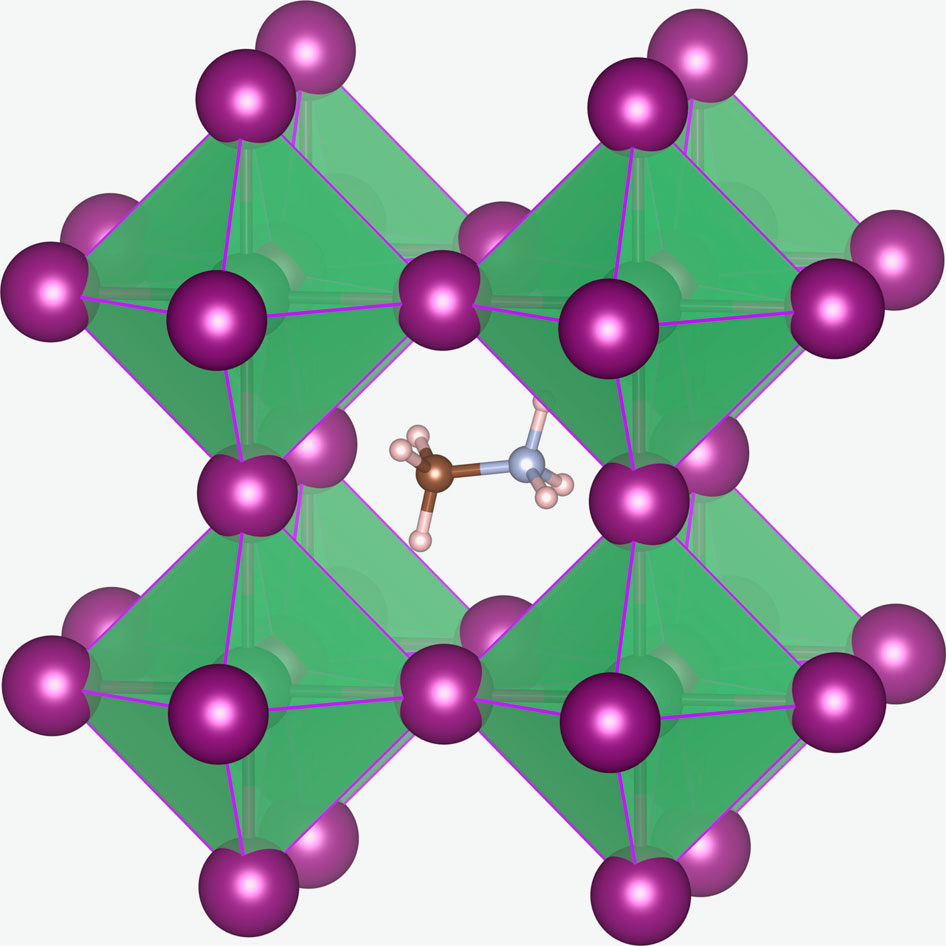
[CH_{3}NH_{3}]PbX_{3} crystal structure.

Methylammonium lead halides (MALHs) are solid compounds with perovskite structure and a chemical formula of [CH_{3}NH_{3}]^{+}Pb^{2+}(X^{−})_{3}, where X = Cl, Br or I. They have potential applications in solar cells, lasers, light-emitting diodes, photodetectors, radiation detectors, scintillator, magneto-optical data storage and hydrogen production.

== Properties and synthesis ==
The first MALHs to be synthesized were the methylammonium derivatives [CH_{3}NH_{3}]SnX_{3} and [CH_{3}NH_{3}]PbX_{3}. Their potential in the area of energy conversion wasn't realized until decades later. In the [CH_{3}NH_{3}]PbX_{3} cubic crystal structure the methylammonium cation ([CH_{3}NH_{3}]^{+}) is surrounded by PbX_{6} octahedra. The X ions are not fixed and can migrate through the crystal with an activation energy of 0.6 eV; the migration is vacancy assisted. The methylammonium cations can rotate within their cages. At room temperature the ions have the CN axis aligned towards the face directions of the unit cells and the molecules randomly change to another of the six face directions on a 3 ps time scale.

Growth of a [CH_{3}NH_{3}]PbI_{3} single crystal in gamma-butyrolactone at 110 °C. The yellow color originates from the lead(II) iodide precursor.

Growth of a [CH_{3}NH_{3}]PbBr_{3} single crystal in dimethylformamide at 80 °C.

The solubility of MALHs strongly decreases with increased temperature: from 0.8 g/mL at 20 °C to 0.3 g/mL at 80 °C for [CH_{3}NH_{3}]PbBr_{3} in dimethylformamide. This property is used in the growth of MALH single crystals and films from solution, using a mixture of [CH_{3}NH_{3}]X and PbX_{2} powders as the precursor. The growth rates are 3–20 mm^{3}/hour for [CH_{3}NH_{3}]PbI_{3} and reach 38 mm^{3}/hour for [CH_{3}NH_{3}]PbBr_{3} crystals.

The resulting crystals are metastable and dissolve in the growth solution when cooled to room temperature. They have bandgaps of 2.18 eV for [CH_{3}NH_{3}]PbBr_{3} and 1.51 eV for [CH_{3}NH_{3}]PbI_{3}, while their respective carrier mobilities are 24 and 67 cm^{2}/(V·s). Their thermal conductivity is exceptionally low, ~0.5 W/(K·m) at room temperature for [CH_{3}NH_{3}]PbI_{3}.

Thermal decomposition of [CH_{3}NH_{3}]PbI_{3} gives methyl iodide (CH_{3}I) and ammonia (NH_{3}).

[CH_{3}NH_{3}]PbI_{3} → PbI_{2} + CH_{3}I + NH_{3}

== Applications ==
MALHs have potential applications in solar cells, lasers, light-emitting diodes, photodetectors, radiation detectors, scintillator and hydrogen production. The power conversion efficiency of MALH solar cells exceeds 19%.

== Historic references ==
- Weber, Dieter (1978). "CH3NH3SnBrxI3-x (x = 0-3), ein Sn(II)-System mit kubischer Perowskitstruktur / CH3NH3SnBrxI3-x (x = 0-3), a Sn(II)-System with Cubic Perovskite Structure". Zeitschrift für Naturforschung B. 33 (8): 862–865. doi:10.1515/znb-1978-0809. ISSN 1865-7117.
- Weber, Dieter (1978-12-01). "CH3NH3PbX3, ein Pb(II)-System mit kubischer Perowskitstruktur / CH3NH3PbX3, a Pb(II)-System with Cubic Perovskite Structure". Zeitschrift für Naturforschung B. 33 (12): 1443–1445. doi:10.1515/znb-1978-1214. ISSN 1865-7117. S2CID 93597007.*Grätzel, Michael (2014). "The light and shade of perovskite solar cells". Nature Materials. 13 (9): 838–842. Bibcode:2014NatMa..13..838G. doi:10.1038/nmat4065. ISSN 1476-1122. PMID 25141800.

== See also ==
- Perovskite solar cell
- Methylammonium halide
