= Tin-based perovskite solar cell =

A tin-based perovskite solar cell (TPSCs) is a special type of perovskite solar cell, based on a tin perovskite structure (ASnX_{3}, where 'A' is a monovalent organic or inorganic cation (e.g., formamidinium (FA^{+}), methylammonium (MA^{+}), or cesium (Cs^{+})), tin is in its Sn (II) oxidation state and 'X' is a monovalent halogen anion (I^{−}, Br^{−}, Cl^{−}). As a technology, tin-based perovskite solar cells are still in the research phase, and are even less-studied than their counterpart, lead-based perovskite solar cells. The corresponding perovskite solar cells (PSCs) with lead have reached a certified power conversion efficiency (PCE) of 25.2%. However, the toxic lead in perovskites has caused extensive concerns regarding to the real-life applications of PSCs. There are environmental concerns with using lead-based perovskite solar cells in large-scale applications; one such concern is that since the material is soluble in water, and lead is highly toxic, any contamination from damaged solar cells could cause major health and environmental problems. Therefore, the development of eco-friendly lead-free PSCs is highly desired and has emerged as a promising alternative to conventional lead-based perovskite photovoiltaicm, due to the reduced environmental impact and comparable performance potential. Several tin-based perovskites such as CsSnI_{3}, MASnI_{3}, and FASnI_{3} have been reported for fabricating lead-free PSCs. Recent studies highlight formamidinium tin iodide (FASnI_{3}) as a leading candidate due to its superior optoelectronic properties and bandgap (~1.3 eV).

The maximum solar cell efficiency reported and certified is 16.65% for a triple-cation, double-anion (Cs,FA,PEA)Sn(I,Br)_{3}, 14.6% for a modified formamidinium tin triiodide-based (CH(NH_{2})_{2}SnI_{3} or FASnI_{3}) composition with additional NH_{4}SCN and PEABr content, 5.73% for CH_{3}NH_{3}SnIBr_{2}, 3% for CsSnI_{3} (5.03% in quantum dots), and above 10% for various compositions based on formamidinium tin triiodide.

FASnI_{3} in particular may hold promise because, applied as a thin film, it appears to have the potential to exceed the Shockley–Queisser limit by allowing hot-electron capture, which could considerably raise the efficiency.

== Materials and structure ==
TPSCs possess a similar crystal structure to their lead-based counterparts but face challenges related to the oxidation of Sn^{2+} to Sn^{4+}, which leads to material degradation and efficiency loss. Common tin-based perovskite materials include:

- FASnI_{3}: Exhibits high photovoltaic efficiency and enhanced stability compared to MASnI_{3}.
- MASnI_{3}: Features a direct bandgap but suffers from rapid oxidation and structural instability.
- CsSnI_{3}: Fully inorganic, offering greater thermal stability but lower efficiency.

To mitigate these issues, researchers have explored mixed-cation compositions (e.g., FA/Cs blends) and surface passivation strategies incorporating reducing agents like SnF_{2} to suppress oxidation. Recent studies also suggest that doping with elements such as germanium (Ge) can enhance structural stability and charge carrier transport properties.

=== Bandgap Tunability and Alloying Effects ===
The bandgap of TPSCs can be tuned by incorporating mixed halides (e.g., I^{−}/Br^{−} blends) or alloying with Ge or Pb, influencing absorption properties and energy conversion efficiency. Recent studies indicate that bandgap engineering can optimize carrier transport properties and reduce recombination losses, leading to better performance in multi-junction solar cell architectures.

Additionally, studies demonstrate that reducing energy-level mismatch in formamidinium tin iodide perovskites significantly improves carrier transport and efficiency.

== Enhance stability ==
=== Stability and Degradation Mechanisms ===
The primary limitation of TPSCs is their inherent instability, particularly due to the oxidation of Sn^{2+} to Sn^{4+}, which creates defects and increases charge recombination. Solar cell stability is critical to practical applications especially for outdoor photovoltaic modules that are expected to be used for tens of years. The stability of Sn-based PSCs is greatly dependent on the fabrication pro-cess and perovskite composition. Tin-based perovskites have the potential to outperform the PCE and stability of lead-based perovskite solar cells. There are lots of ways to enhance the stability. Several experimental and simulation studies have predicted that the addition of the cesium Cs + can enhance the thermodynamic structural stability of FASnI3, prevent Sn2+ oxidation, and increase geometric symmetry. Research from Marshall et al. has improved the stability and efficiency of PSCs without a hole-selective interfacial layer. Next, by alloying Ge (II) in CsSnI3 to develop a CsSn0.5Ge0.5I3 composition perovskite, thin films of CsSnI3-based PSCs can become very stable and air tolerant. Qiu et al. also suggested creating high-quality B-γ CsSnI3 thin films with a two-step sequential deposition process. Furthermore, to overcome the difficulty of large-scale manufacturing, several researchers have focused on refining deposition techniques and enhancing perovskite nano crystals or perovskite ink. The solvent SnI_{2} is also one of the additives commonly used in Sn-based alloys to reduce the impurity of the Sn source. The charge transport in the 2D perovskite caused the efficiency to decrease, so a 3D precursor was introduced to develop 2D/3D mixed Sn-based perovskites to obtain far better performance and stability than pure quasi2D perovskites.

- Antioxidant additives: Incorporation of SnF_{2} and pyrazine to maintain Sn^{2+} stability and limit oxidation.
- Encapsulation techniques: Protective barrier layers prevent moisture and oxygen penetration, prolonging device longevity.
- Mixed-Cation formulations: Combining FA, MA, and Cs enhances structural robustness and mitigates phase instability.
- Gradient doping strategies: Recent research has demonstrated that introducing Ge or other dopants improves charge separation and enhances stability.

==== Advanced Interface Optimization and Defect Passivation ====
New buffer layers and defect passivation techniques have been developed to suppress surface and grain boundary defects, enhancing carrier mobility and stability. Self-assembled monolayers (SAMs) and organic-inorganic hybrid interfacial coatings have shown promise in improving charge transport efficiency.

Furthermore, study reported that using fullerene-based passivation layers enhances device efficiency and prevents degradation, making TPSCs more stable for long-term use.

== Sn^{2+} to Sn^{4+} Oxidarion and p self-doping ==
The main obstacle to viable tin perovskite solar cells is the instability of tin's oxidation state Sn^{2+}, which is easily oxidized to the stabler Sn^{4+}. In solar cell research, this process is called self-doping, because the Sn^{4+} acts as a p-dopant and reduces solar cell efficiency. The vacancy defects that promote this process are the subject of active research; folk wisdom holds that the process requires tin vacancies, but in CsSnI_{3}, the primary hole contributors are instead Cs vacancies. In general, reducing tin vacancies is still ideal, because they impede charge carrier motion and lower efficiency.

Several techniques have been explored as a means of counteracting the self-doping of Sn-based perovskites. One method is the sealing of cells with polymers such as poly(methyl methacrylate) so that they are not exposed to oxygen. Alternatively, increasing the size of the organic component is believed to geometrically bar diffusion of oxygen. However, these techniques do not counteract Sn^{4+} ions formed during cell synthesis. Such ions can be with a chelating ligand, e.g. formamidinium chloride; the tin coordination complex can then be removed with gentle (<60 °C) heat. As long as the temperature to vaporize the complex is below that at which the perovskite loses mass, the perovskite film will remain intact after this processing step, save for the removed Sn(IV) ions.

Another option is adding reducing agents as sacrificial anodes: these may be as varied as maltol, gallic acid, or hydrazine. Tin-based reductants, such as the pure element or stannous halides, also act as a tin source, filling in Sn vacancies.

Annealing perovskite films during deposition also reduces self-doping.

== Morphology of thin films ==
Another challenge of tin perovskite solar cells is to be found in the rapid crystallization of tin perovskite, often leading to poor morphology, high pinhole density and incomplete substrate coverage. The morphology of the tin perovskite thin films has been improved via vapor-assisted processing and hot antisolvent methods. Other studies suggest that the addition of methylammonium chloride into the precursor solution improves the morphology of the tin perovskite thin films. SnF_{2} is a key additive for tin-based PSCs because other than possibly improving morphology, it can sequestrate the oxidized Sn^{4+} in solution, increase the energy of formation of tin vacancies, leading to decreased concentrations of defects of this kind. A similar result was reported with SnCl_{2} as additive in tin perovskite. An addition of SnF_{2} can also improve the film morphology because the additive can act as heterogeneous nucleation sites, not only facilitating the formation of more tin perovskite nuclei but also enabling more homogeneous crystal growth with full surface coverage.

== Timeline of the best-research cell efficiency advancement ==
- In April 2025, researchers from the University of Queensland have published an article setting a new record for Pb-free, Sn-based perovskite solar cells. They used a triple cation (PEA^{+}, FA^{+}, Cs^{+}) and double anion (I^{-},Br^{-}) perovskite to develop homogeneous 2D/3D heterostructured tin halide perovskite thin films. By introducing cesium cations, they synchronized the nucleation kinetics of 2D and 3D perovskite phases, resulting in a uniform microstructure with reduced trap states. This approach led to a certified power conversion efficiency of 16.65% and stable operation for over 1,500 hours under continuous illumination without encapsulation.
- In April 2024, researchers from ShanghaiTech University used a FASnI_{3}-based perovskite absorber and formed self-assembled phosphonate-terminated ammonium dipole layers at its interface with the electron-transport layer. This interface dipole raised the open-circuit voltage to 0.974 V and pushed the power conversion efficiency to 15.7%, coupled with operational stability to over 85% of initial efficiency after 1,000 hours of continuous illumination (T_{85} = 1000 h).
- In January 2024, researchers from Huaqiao University developed efficient tin-based perovskite solar cells using the composition PEA_{0.15}FA_{0.85}SnI_{3} and trans-isomeric fulleropyrrolidine (TPPF) additives. TPPF improved crystal orientation and film quality by slowing crystallization, achieving a certified efficiency of 15.14% and long-term stability over 3,000 hours of storage and 500 h under continuous illumination.
- In July 2021, researches from ShanghaiTech University published an article in which they reported on a tin perovskite solar cell based on PEA_{0.15}FA_{0.85}SnI_{3} for which the SnI_{2} precursor was synthesized ad hoc in the form of SnI_{2}·(DMSO)_{x} adducts, enabling a certified PCE of 14.6% and a stability of T_{96} = 2400 h in the dark and at least T_{95} = 1 h under continuous illumination.
- In December 2020, researchers from Peking University published an article in which they report a tin-based perovskite solar cell based on FASnIBr_{2} and treated with phenylhydrazine hydrochloride resulting in a certified efficiency of 12.4% and a T_{82} of 330 h under continuous illumination.

== Advances and applications ==
Recent breakthroughs in TPSCs have led to efficiency improvements, with power conversion efficiencies (PCEs) now exceeding 15% compared to earlier values of ~6%. Notable developments include:

- Tandem solar cells: integration with silicon or wide-bandgap perovskites to enhance overall energy conversion efficiency.
- Flexible and transparent devices: TPSCs are being developed for applications in wearable electronics and building-integrated photovoltaics (BIPV).
- Scalable manufacturing: techniques such as blade coating and inkjet printing are being optimized for large-scale production.

Despite these advancements, further improvements in material stability, encapsulation techniques, and large-scale manufacturing processes are necessary for TPSCs to become commercially viable against lead-based perovskite and silicon solar cells.
