= Olga Malinkiewicz =

Polish physicist (born 1982)

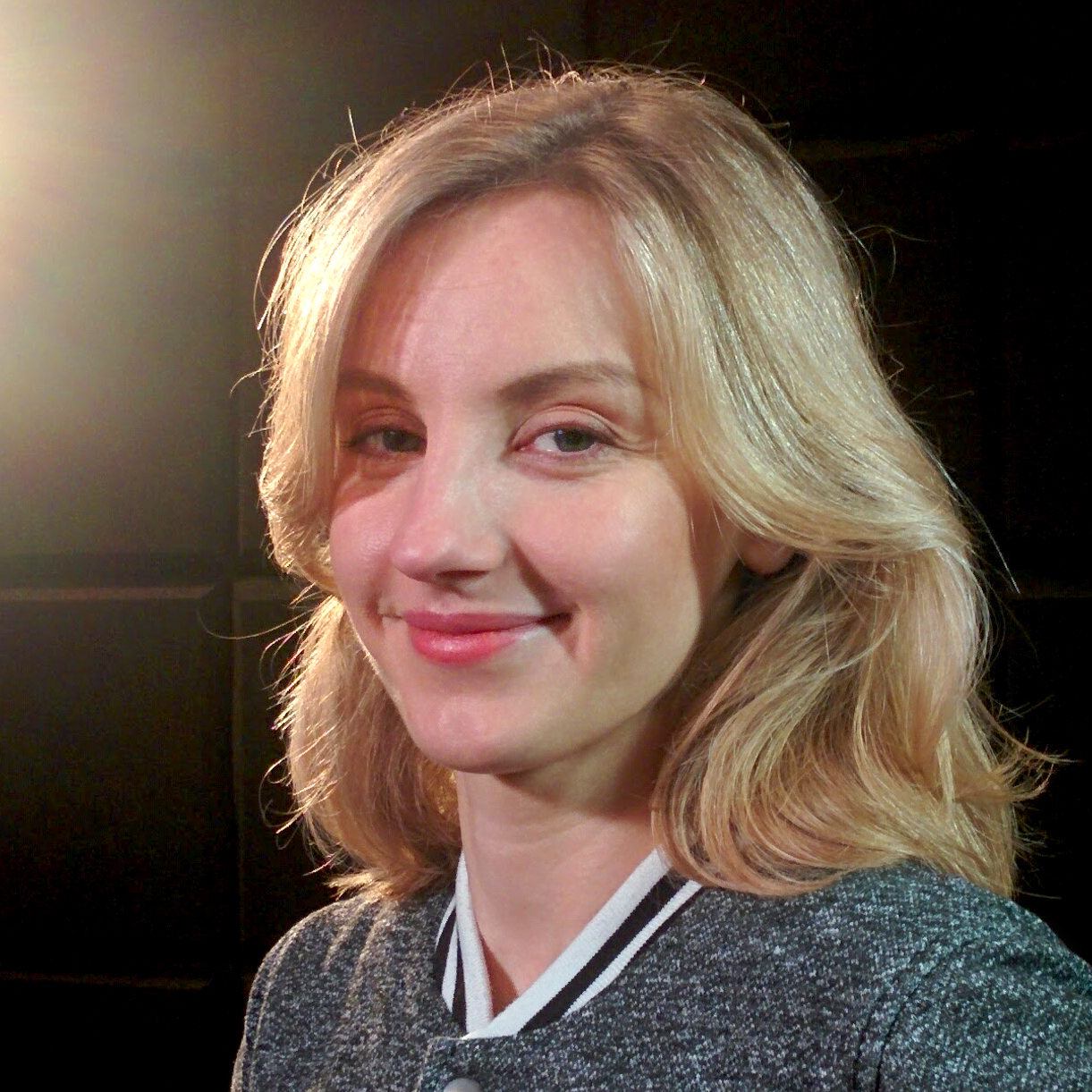
- Malinkiewicz in 2017
- Born: 26 November 1982 (age 43); Wrocław, Poland
- Education: University of Warsaw; Barcelona University of Technology
- Occupations: Physicist, entrepreneur
- Known for: research on perovskite solar cells co-founder of Saule Technologies
- Awards: European Inventor Award (2024); Order of Polonia Restituta (2016)
- Scientific career
- Workplaces: ICFO – The Institute of Photonic Sciences

Olga Malinkiewicz (Polish pronunciation: [ˈɔlɡa malinˈkjɛvit͡ʂ]; born 26 November 1982) is a Polish physicist, inventor and entrepreneur. She is known for inventing a method of producing solar cells based on perovskites using inkjet printing. She is a co-founder and the Chief Technology Officer at Saule Technologies. She is the recipient of two European Inventor Awards (2024).

== Biography ==
Malinkiewicz was born in 1982 in Wrocław, Poland. She started her studies at the Faculty of Physics at the University of Warsaw, where she obtained a Bachelor in 2005. She graduated from the Barcelona University of Technology in Barcelona in 2010. While still a student, in 2009 she started working at the ICFO Institute. In 2017, she obtained her PhD from ICMol – Institute for Molecular Science of the University of Valencia at the group of Dr. Henk Bolink, with a thesis on low cost, efficient hybrid solar cells. In 2014 she founded Saule Technologies, with private backing and turned down an offer of €1 million (US$1.3 million) for 10% of the start-up. The name of the company derives from Saulė, the goddess of the Sun in Baltic mythology.

== Awards ==
During her studies, Olga developed a novel perovskite solar cell architecture allowing the fabrication of such devices at low temperatures, while retaining high efficiency. She has been granted with the Photonics21 Student Innovation award in a competition organised by the European Commission in 2014 for this achievement. She published an article on the subject in Nature Scientific Reports. In 2015 Olga was honored with an award in the Innovators Under 35 ranking, organized by MIT Technology Review for "developing a new technology that could spark a “social revolution” in renewable energies".

In 2016, she was awarded the Knight's Cross of the Order of Polonia Restituta by the President of Poland Andrzej Duda for her "outstanding contributions to the development of Polish science". For her future science and business activities, she was distinguished by the American Chemical Society as one of the top women entrepreneurs in new technologies.

In 2021, she received the Lem's Planet Award in the technology category for her invention and commercialization of the printed perovskite-based solar cells. In 2024, as the first Polish woman scientist, she received two European Inventor Awards presented by the European Patent Office. The first award was granted in the Small and Medium-Sized Enterprises category while the second one was in the Popular Prize category. Malinkiewicz and her team were recognized for "advancing solar energy technology with their cost-effective and environmentally friendly perovskite solar cells", which was described as a visionary idea and a technology that can change the world.

== Professional life ==
In 2015, she co-founded Saule Technologies (named after the Baltic sun goddess), along with two Polish businessmen. A partnership was signed in January 2018 with the Swedish construction company Skanska. The company is also looking for partnership with other companies operating in the Middle East. It is also working with Egis Group, a rigid plastics film producer, on the encapsulation of the cells.

== See also ==
- List of Poles
- Timeline of Polish science and technology
