= Perovskite solar cell =

Alternative to silicon-based photovoltaics

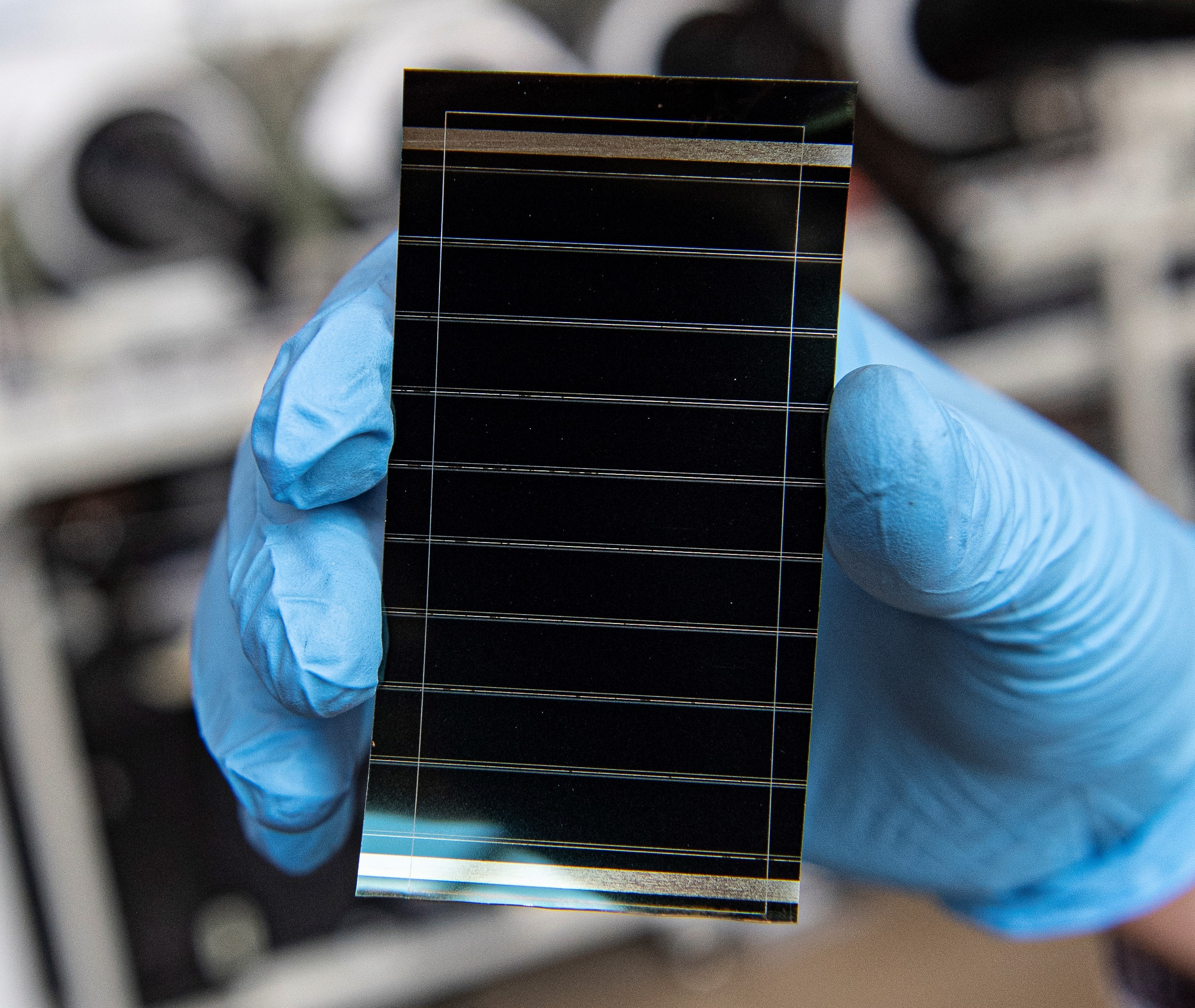
A perovskite solar cell

A perovskite solar cell (PSC) is a type of solar cell that includes a perovskite-structured compound, most commonly a hybrid organic–inorganic lead or tin halide-based material as the light-harvesting active layer. Perovskite materials, such as methylammonium lead halides and the all-inorganic cesium lead halide, are cheap to produce and simple to manufacture.

Solar-cell efficiencies of laboratory-scale devices using these materials have increased from 3.8% in 2009 to 27% in 2025 in single-junction architectures, and, in silicon-based tandem cells, to 34.85%, exceeding the maximum efficiency achieved in single-junction silicon solar cells. Perovskite solar cells have therefore been the fastest-advancing solar technology as of 2016. With the potential of achieving even higher efficiencies and very low production costs, perovskite solar cells have become commercially attractive. Core problems and research subjects include their long-term stability, high sensitivity to moisture, and toxicity if lead is used. Managing toxic lead in PSCs is essential, as exposure presents significant health risks, including neurological disorders. Because PSCs are an emerging technology, lead toxicity remains a major hurdle to widespread adoption and commercialization.

== Advantages ==
The raw materials used and the possible fabrication methods (such as various printing techniques) are both low-cost. Their high absorption coefficient enables ultrathin films of around 500 nm to absorb the complete visible solar spectrum. These features combined result in the ability to create low-cost, high-efficiency, thin, lightweight and flexible solar modules. Perovskite solar cells have found use in powering prototypes of low-power wireless electronics for ambient-powered Internet of things applications, and may help mitigate climate change.

Perovskite cells also possess many optoelectrical properties that benefit their use in solar cells. For example, the exciton binding energy is small. This allows electron holes and electrons to be easily separated upon the absorption of a photon. Moreover, the long diffusion distance of the charge carrier and the high diffusivity – the rate of diffusion – allow the charge carriers to travel long distances within the perovskite solar cell, which improves the chance of it to be absorbed and converted to power. Lastly, perovskite cells are characterized by wide absorption ranges and high absorption coefficients, which further increase the power efficiency of the solar cell by increasing the range of photon energies that are absorbed.

Perovskite solar cells (PSCs) are considered strong candidates in the photovoltaic sector due to their low energy payback time (EPBT), low levelized cost of electricity (LCOE), and rapidly increasing power conversion efficiencies (PCEs). In under two decades, PSCs have reached laboratory efficiencies of 27%, a milestone that monocrystalline silicon required more than 50 years to achieve, owing largely to perovskites' defect tolerance, low recombination losses, and long carrier diffusion lengths. Perovskite materials can also be combined with other photovoltaic technologies in tandem architectures, with perovskite–silicon two-terminal devices recently achieving a record PCE of 34.6%, underscoring their potential for next-generation high-efficiency solar cells.

== Materials used ==
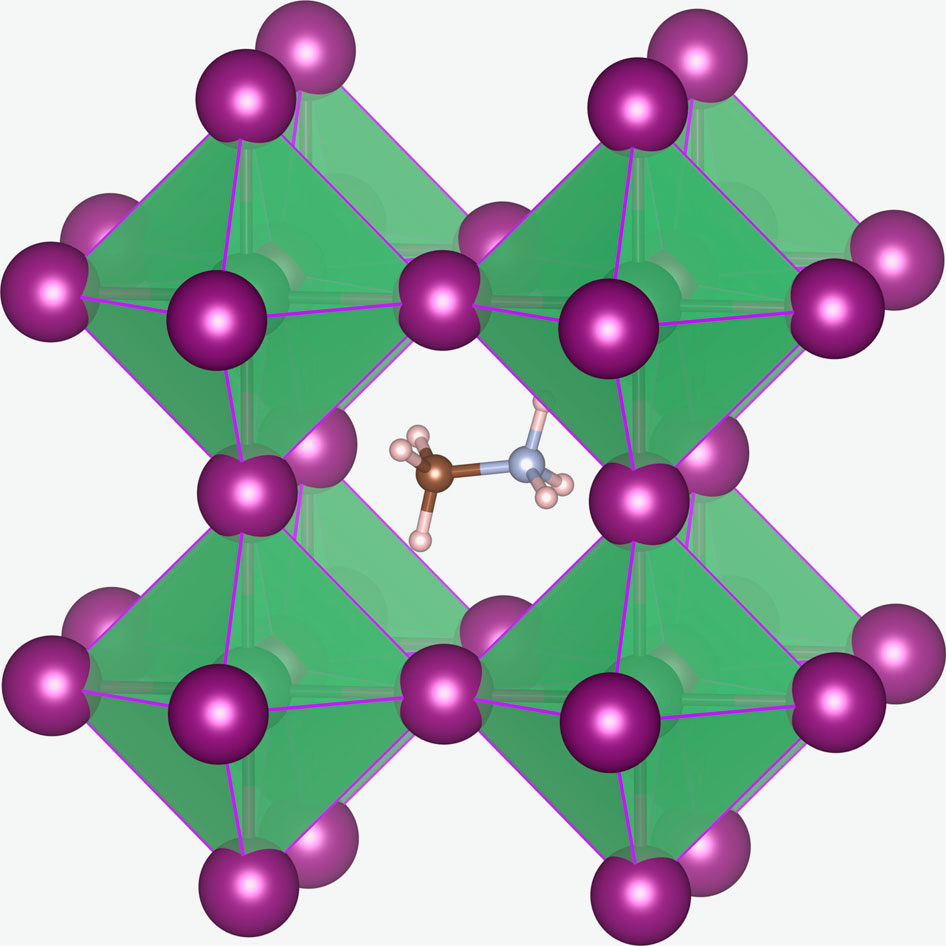
Crystal structure of CH_{3}NH_{3}PbX_{3} perovskites (X=I, Br and/or Cl). The methylammonium cation (CH_{3}NH_{3}^{+}) is surrounded by PbX_{6} octahedra.

The name "perovskite solar cell" refers to the ABX_{3} crystal structure of the absorber materials, called perovskite structure, where A and B are cations and X is an anion. A cations with radii between 1.60 Å and 2.50 Å have been found to form perovskite structures. The most commonly studied perovskite absorber is methylammonium lead trihalide (CH_{3}NH_{3}PbX_{3}, where X is a halogen ion such as iodide, bromide, or chloride), which has an optical bandgap between ~1.55 and 2.3 eV, depending on halide content. Formamidinium lead trihalide (H_{2}NCHNH_{2}PbX_{3}) has also shown promise, with bandgaps between 1.48 and 2.2 eV. The perovskite composition H₂NCHNH₂PbI₃ and its favorable bandgap were first reported in the seminal work of Stoumpos, Malliakas, and Kanatzidis on semiconducting tin and lead iodide perovskites, and compositional variants of this system now form the basis of the most efficient perovskite solar cells known today. Its minimum bandgap is closer to the optimal for a single-junction cell than methylammonium lead trihalide, so it should be capable of higher efficiencies. The first use of perovskite in a solid-state solar cell was in a dye-sensitized cell using CsSnI_{3} as a p-type hole transport layer and absorber. In this all solid state architecture, CsSnI₃ replaced the liquid electrolyte and provided both efficient hole conduction and additional solar light absorption extending into the red and near infrared. This work established that a three dimensional halide perovskite could function as an active semiconducting component in a solid-state device at high efficiency, and it laid essential groundwork for the modern generation of halide perovskite solar cells. A common concern is the inclusion of lead as a component of perovskite materials; solar cells composed from tin-based perovskite absorbers such as CH_{3}NH_{3}SnI_{3} have also been reported, though with lower power-conversion efficiencies.

=== Shockley–Queisser limit ===
Solar cell efficiency is limited by the Shockley–Queisser limit. This calculated limit sets the maximum theoretical efficiency of a solar cell using a single junction with no other loss aside from radiative recombination in the solar cell. Based on the AM1.5G global solar spectra, the maximum power conversion efficiency is correlated to a respective bandgap, forming a parabolic relationship.

This limit is described by the equation

$$\eta = t_s \times u (x_g) \times v(f, x_g, x_c) \times m(vx_g/x_c)$$

Where

$$x_g = V_g/V_s \ ; \  x_c = V_c/V_s$$

and u is the ultimate efficiency factor, and v is the ratio of open circuit voltage V_{op} to band-gap voltage V_{g}, and m is the impedance matching factor, and V_{c} is the thermal voltage, and V_{s} is the voltage equivalent of the temperature of the Sun.

The most efficient bandgap is found to be at 1.34 eV, with a maximum power conversion efficiency (PCE) of 33.7%. Reaching this ideal bandgap energy can be difficult, but utilizing tunable perovskite solar cells allows for the flexibility to match this value. Further experimenting with multijunction solar cells allow for the Shockley-Queisser limit to be surpassed, expanding to allow photons of a broader wavelength range to be absorbed and converted, without increasing thermalisation loss.

The actual band gap for formamidinium (FA) lead trihalide can be tuned as low as 1.48 eV, which is closer to the ideal bandgap energy of 1.34 eV for maximum power-conversion efficiency single junction solar cells, predicted by the Shockley–Queisser Limit. The 1.3 eV bandgap energy has been successfully achieved with the (FAPbI_{3})_{1−x}(CsSnI_{3})_{x} hybrid cell, which has a tunable bandgap energy (E_{g}) from 1.24 – 1.41 eV.

=== Multi-junction solar cells ===
Multi-junction solar cells are capable of a higher power conversion efficiency (PCE), increasing the threshold beyond the thermodynamic maximum set by the Shockley-Queisser limit for single junction cells. By having multiple bandgaps in a single cell, it prevents the loss of photons above or below the band gap energy of a single junction solar cell. In tandem (double) junction solar cells, PCE of 31.1% has been recorded, increasing to 37.9% for triple junction and 38.8% for quadruple junction solar cells. However, the metal organic chemical vapor deposition (mocvd) process needed to synthesize lattice-matched and crystalline solar cells with more than one junction is very expensive, making it a less than ideal candidate for widespread use.

Perovskite semiconductors offer an option that has the potential to rival the efficiency of multi-junction solar cells but can be synthesized under more common conditions at a greatly reduced cost. Rivalling the double, triple, and quadruple junction solar cells mentioned above, are all-perovskite tandem cells with a max PCE of 31.9%, all-perovskite triple-junction cell reaching 33.1%, and the perovskite-Si triple-junction cell, reaching an efficiency of 35.3%. These multi-junction perovskite solar cells, in addition to being available for cost-effective synthesis, also maintain high PCE under varying weather extremes, making them utilizable worldwide.

Perovskite–silicon tandem solar cells (PSTSCs) are an emerging class of multi-junction photovoltaic devices. These cells combine a conventional silicon sub-cell with an upper perovskite absorber layer to achieve broader spectral utilization. Silicon has a band gap of approximately 1.12 eV, while the perovskite band gap can be tuned between about 1.6 and 1.8 eV, enabling theoretical power-conversion efficiencies of up to 45.3% for perovskite–silicon tandems.

PSTSCs are commonly categorized by the number of electrical terminals used to interconnect the sub-cells. Two-terminal (2T) designs place the perovskite and silicon cells in series, joined by an interconnection layer. This architecture is relatively low-cost but requires strict current matching between the sub-cells; any mismatch results in current losses, and it constrains the perovskite band-gap selection to the illumination and the silicon cell's characteristics .

Four-terminal (4T) tandems physically stack the two sub-cells but operate them independently, eliminating current-matching constraints and allowing each cell to be optimized separately. Three-terminal (3T) devices represent an intermediate architecture: the sub-cells contribute separate currents but their voltages add, removing the need for current matching while using fewer terminals than a 4T design.

Although perovskite–silicon tandem cells have demonstrated rapid efficiency gains, large-scale commercialization remains limited. Key challenges include high materials and processing costs, limited manufacturing infrastructure, and reduced long-term stability relative to conventional single-junction silicon modules. Ongoing advances in perovskite chemistry, device architecture, and encapsulation may enable PSTSCs to become a high-efficiency option for applications where maximizing power per unit area is critical.

=== Chiral ligands ===
Utilizing organic chiral ligands shows promise for increasing the maximum power conversion efficiency for halide perovskite solar cells, when utilized correctly. Chirality can be produced in inorganic semiconductors by enantiomeric distortions near the surface of the lattice, electronic coupling between the substrate and a chiral ligand, assembly into a chiral secondary structure, or chiral surface defects. By attaching a chiral phenylethylamine ligand to an achiral lead bromide perovskite nanoplatelet, a chiral inorganic-organic perovskite is formed. Inspection of the inorganic-organic perovskite via Circular Dichroism (CD) spectroscopy, reveals two regions. One represents the charge transfer between the ligand and the nanoplatelet (300-350 nm), and the other represents the excitonic absorption maximum of the perovskite. Evidence of charge transfer in these systems shows promise for increasing power conversion efficiency in perovskite solar cells.

=== Inorganic perovskites ===
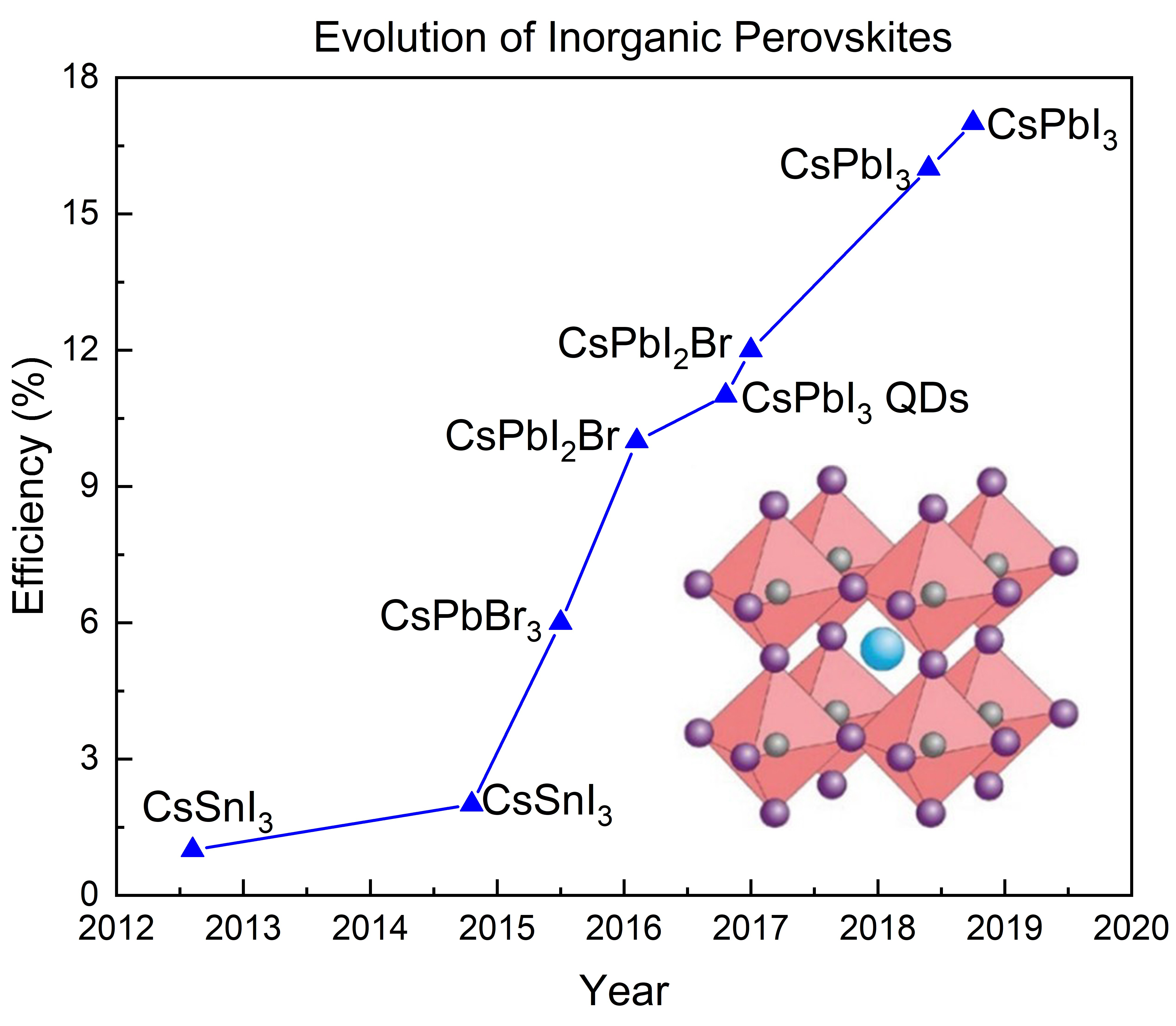
Improvement in the power conversion efficiency of inorganic perovskites over the past decade of development, basic structure

The organic component such as methylammonium or formamidinium is one of the bases of the chemical instability. Encapsulation to prevent this decay is expensive. Fully inorganic perovskites could minimize this problem. Fully inorganic perovskites have PCE over 21%. These high performing fully inorganic perovskite cells are created using CsPbI_{3-x}Br_{x}, which has a band gap similar to that of high performing OIHPs (~1.7 eV), as well as excellent optoelectrical properties. Although chemically stable, CsPbI_{3-x} faces significant issues with phase stability that prevent its broad industrial application. In high efficiency CsPbI_{3}, for example, the photoactive black α-phase is prone to transform into the inactive yellow δ-phase, seriously inhibiting the performance, especially when exposed to moisture. This also made them difficult to synthesize at ambient temperatures as the black α-phase is thermodynamically unstable with respect to the yellow δ-phase, although this has been recently tackled by Hei Ming Lai's group, who is a psychiatrist. The challenge of stabilizing the photoactive black α-phase of inorganic perovskite materials has been tackled in a variety of strategies, including octahedral anchoring and secondary crystal growth.

=== 2D hybrid organic-inorganic perovskites ===
2D perovskites are characterized by improved stability and excitonic confinement properties compared with 3D perovskites, while maintaining the charge transport properties of 3D perovskite materials. Furthermore, the 2D hybrid organic-inorganic perovskite (HOIP) structure also eases the steric restrictions on the "B" cations, as outlined by the Goldschmidt's tolerance factor in 3D HOIPs, providing a much larger compositional space to engineer new materials with tailored properties.

==== Structure ====
Hybrid organic-inorganic perovskites (HOIPs), like all perovskites, have the formula ABX_{3}. Size restrictions for each ion A, B, and X are quantified by the Goldschmidt tolerance factor (t).

$t=\frac{r_A+r_X}{\sqrt{2}(r_B+r_X)}$

As t approaches a value of one, what is known as the “aristotype” ideal cubic perovskite structure can form, in which BX_{6} octahedra are corner-sharing with A-cations occupied voids between octahedra. As t deviates from unity, the favored structures become edge- and corner-sharing octahedra.

Characteristically, in HOIPs, the A-site is occupied by a small organic cation, as opposed to an inorganic cation. Methylammonium is frequently used as the organic cation. Generally, HOIPs studied thus far contain a divalent metallic atom in the B-site (typically Pb or Sn) and a halogen (such as Cl, Br, or I) in the X-site. Through X-ray diffraction (XRD), it has been determined that methylammonium lead iodide, MAPbI_{3}, materials structure in orthorhombic arrangement at low temperatures, then transform to tetragonal at 162 K, and finally cubic arrangements at 327 K. This is just one example how varied and intriguing the phase changes, and phase diagrams, of these materials can be.

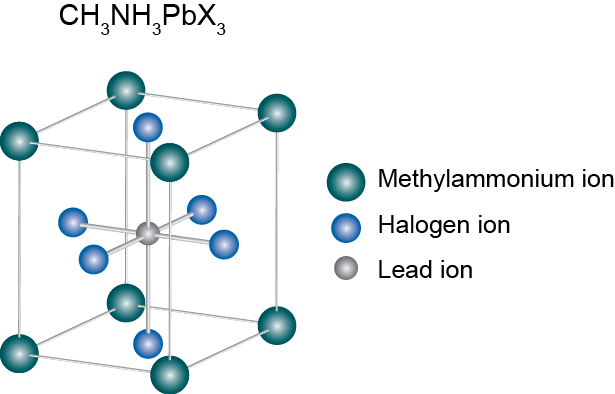
An example of the unit cell of an HOIP, methylammonium lead iodide

HOIPs can be described with the formula (A’)_{m}(A)_{n}_{-1}B_{n}X_{3n+}1. A’ can be divalent, in which case m = 1, or monovalent, where m = 2. The value of n relies on precursor composition and indicates whether the HOIP will be considered two- or three-dimensional. When n = $\infty$, the perovskite is 3D, whereas when n = 1, it is purely 2D. For perovskites where $1\leq n \leq 5$, they are called quasi-2D.

2D halide perovskite layers can be conceptualized as truncated crystallographic planes from the corresponding 3D perovskite structure. By cutting along the $\langle 100 \rangle, \langle 110\rangle, \langle111\rangle$ planes, three families of 2D perovskites can be described. The most commonly reported 2D HOIPs are derived from $\langle100\rangle$-oriented perovskites. These materials can be further divided into Ruddlesden-Popper (RP) phases, Dion-Jacobson (DJ) phases, and phases with cations alternating within the interlayer space (ACI). Among these types, RP-phases are studied the most thus far.

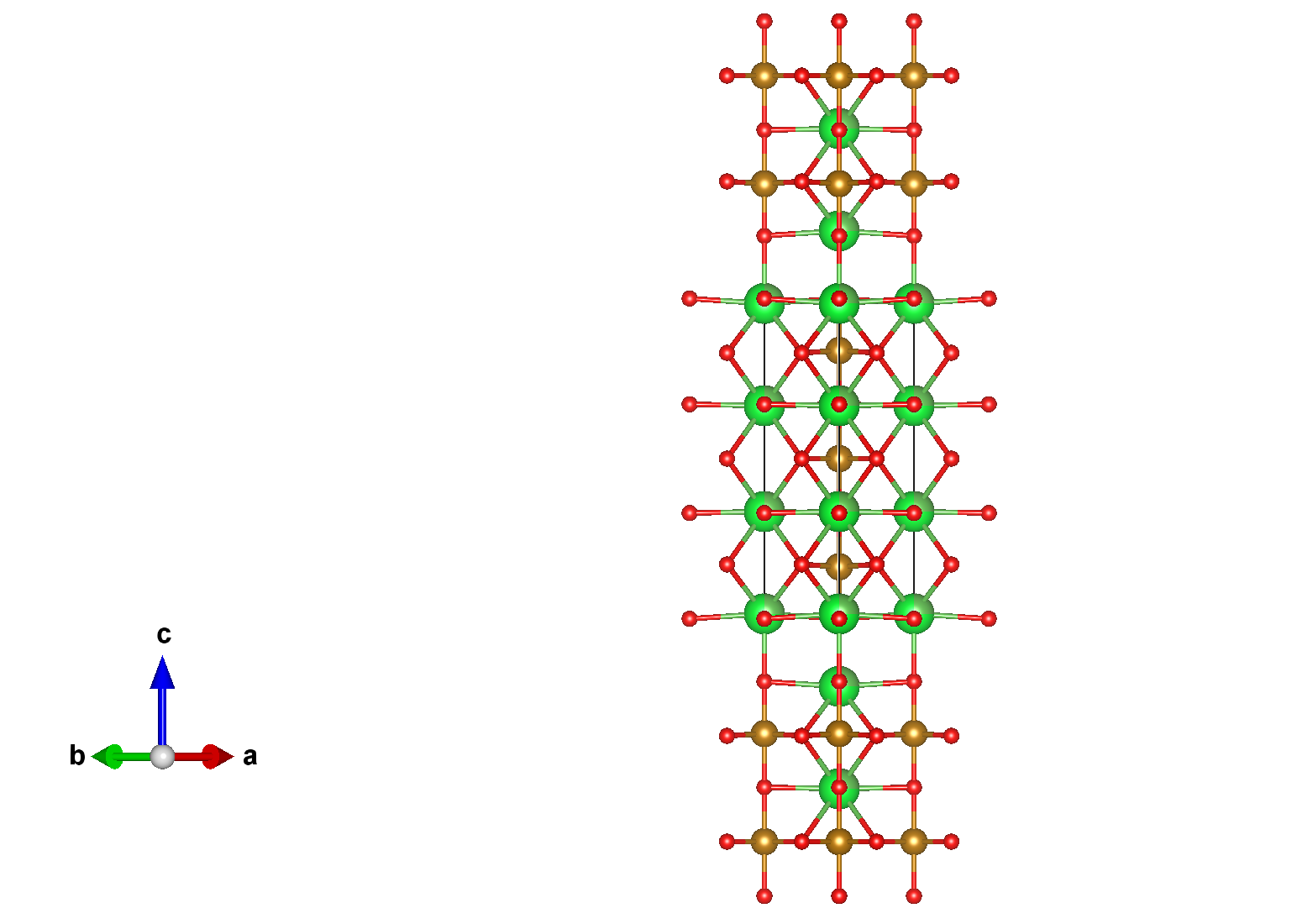
VESTA image of a Ruddlesden-Popper (RP) phase layered 2D hybrid organic-inorganic perovskite

RP-phase HOIPs contain a relatively weak can der Waals gap between a bilayer of monovalent cations and two adjacent lead halide sheets. There is typically an A’ organic cation, generally an aryl ammonium or alkyl cation, and a small A cation, such as methylammonium or Cs^{+}. The inorganic layers are offset by one octahedral unit between planes and also have in-plane displacement. In contrast, DJ-phase HOIPs tend to be made of diamine compounds. These diamine compounds have two amino groups on each end, thus avoiding any gaps between layers and instead forming hydrogen bonds with the inorganic sheets, and are therefore more stable. Inorganic layers in th DJ phase are not offset and stack directly on top of each other. ACI-phase HOIPs have an A and A’ cation, like RP-phase HOIPs, and combine the characteristics of both the RP and DJ phases. The small A cation is able to reside in the led halide sheets as well as stacking in the interlayer spaces with the A’ cation. The only reported cation to form the ACI structure is currently guanidinium (Gua^{+}).

==== Optoelectronic properties ====
The optoelectronic properties of layered perovskites are strongly influenced by quantum and dielectric confinement arising from the alternation of inorganic semiconducting sheets and insulating organic spacer layers. Compared with three-dimensional perovskites, layered perovskites typically exhibit larger exciton binding energies, more pronounced excitonic absorption and emission features, and wider band gaps, although these properties depend strongly on the number of inorganic layers, the identity of the organic spacer, and structural distortions within the inorganic framework. Charge transport is also highly anisotropic: carrier motion is generally more efficient within the inorganic layers than across the organic interlayers, so crystal orientation can strongly influence device performance. These features have made layered perovskites of interest for solar cells, light-emitting diodes and other optoelectronic devices, where enhanced environmental stability can offset some of the transport limitations associated with reduced dimensionality.

==== Mechanical properties ====
To achieve mechanically durable devices, a top priority is to understand the inherent mechanical properties of the materials. Like other 2D materials, mechanical properties are analyzed using computational methods and are verified using experiments.

Nanoindentation is a common technique to measure mechanical properties of 2D materials. Nanoindentation results in 2D HOIP reveal anisotropy in the Young's modulus along different plane directions (100, 001, and 110). Gao et al. showed single-crystal (C_{6}H_{5}CH_{2}NH_{3})_{2}PbCl_{4} had mid-range anisotropy in these directions because of corner sharing inherent to the crystal structure. The strongest direction was the [100] direction which is perpendicular to the inorganic layers. Generally, across many 2D HOIPs, there is a dominant correlation between increased Pb-X (very common cation) bond strength and Young's moduli. Similarly, another nanoindentation study found that changing the A ion from organic CH_{3}NH_{3+} to inorganic Cs^{+} has negligible effects on the Young's modulus, whereas the Pb–X strength has the dominating effect. Due to the increased mechanical stability of the inorganic layers, nanoindentation finds that 2D HOIP structures with thicker and more densely packed inorganic layers have increased Young's moduli and increased stability.

A study by Tu et al. performed mechanical properties testing on a simple lead iodide system to investigate the role of the number and the length of subunits (organic layer) on the out of plane Young's modulus utilizing nanoindentation. This study found that 2D HOIPs are softer than 3D counterparts due to a shift from covalent/ionic bonding to van der waals bonding. Furthermore, increasing the number of subunits "n" from (1–5) increases the Young's modulus and hardness until reaching 3D standard values. The length of the organic chain decreases and plateau's the Young's modulus. These factors can be tailored when designing perovskites solar cells for unique applications.

2D HOIP are also susceptible to the negative Poisson's ratio phenomenon, in which a material contracts laterally with stretched and expands laterally when compressed. This phenomenon is observed commonly in 2D materials and the Poisson's ratio can be modulated by changing the "X" halide in the 2D HOIP chemistry. Halides with weaker electronegativity form weaker bonds with the "B" cation resulting in increased (in magnitude) negative poisson ratio. This leaver allows for tunable flexibility of 2D HOIPs and applications of microelectromechanical and nanoelectronics devices.

=== Perovskite quantum dots ===
Perovskite quantum dots (PQDs) represent nanocrystalline forms of lead halide perovskites with dimensions typically below 10–20 nanometers, falling within or near the exciton Bohr radius (the characteristic distance between an electron and hole in a bound state) of these materials, which ranges from approximately 5–12 nm for common compositions. At this scale, quantum confinement effects fundamentally alter the electronic structure by discretizing energy levels rather than maintaining the continuous band structure characteristic of bulk perovskites. This quantum confinement enables precise band gap tuning through size control. For instance, cesium lead iodide (CsPbI_{3}) quantum dots exhibit bandgaps tunable from approximately 1.73 eV in bulk form to over 2.0 eV in strongly confined quantum dots, while maintaining the photoactive cubic perovskite phase that is thermodynamically unstable in bulk form at room temperature. This phase stability, combined with the inherent defect tolerance of perovskite materials, positions quantum dot architectures as a potential approach for addressing the critical durability limitations of bulk perovskite films.

==== Quantum confinement and bandgap engineering ====
Quantum confinement in perovskite quantum dots arises from the spatial restriction of charge carrier wavefunctions in all three dimensions, creating discrete energy states whose separation increases as particle size decreases. This quantum size effect enables systematic bandgap engineering through precise control of nanocrystal dimensions during synthesis. For CsPbI_{3} quantum dots, bandgaps can be continuously tuned across the range of 1.75 to 2.13 eV by varying particle size, making them candidates for top cells in tandem architectures where wide-bandgap absorbers are required. Recent studies have demonstrated that the bandgap widening in small perovskite nanocrystallites results from concurrent quantum confinement and size-dependent structural effects, with the latter arising from increased tilting of PbI_{6} octahedra and off-centering of lead atoms in smaller particles.

The tunability extends beyond simple size effects to compositional engineering, where mixed-halide quantum dots (CsPbI_{3-x}Br_{x}) enable bandgap modulation while maintaining quantum confinement properties. This precise bandgap control allows quantum dot absorbers to be optimized for specific applications, including the 1.34 eV ideal bandgap for single-junction solar cells predicted by the Shockley-Queisser limit, as well as complementary bandgaps for multi-junction tandem configurations.

==== Enhanced charge carrier dynamics ====
Beyond bandgap engineering, quantum confinement also fundamentally alters charge transport properties. Perovskite quantum dots exhibit improved charge carrier dynamics compared to bulk thin films, arising from their nanoscale dimensions and high surface-to-volume ratios. The strong quantum confinement reduces the required charge diffusion length from micrometers in bulk films to hundreds of nanometers in quantum dot solids, as carriers need only traverse shorter distances between collection interfaces.

CsPbI_{3} quantum dot films treated with formamidinium iodide (FAI) demonstrate electron mobilities reaching 0.50 cm^{2} V^{−1} s^{−1} and diffusion lengths of approximately 239 nm. These values represent improvements over untreated films and enable efficient photocurrent collection. The inherent defect tolerance of perovskites is retained and potentially enhanced in quantum dot form, as the high density of surface ligands passivates dangling bonds and uncoordinated lead or halide sites that would otherwise serve as trap states.

Time-resolved photoluminescence studies reveal that properly passivated quantum dot films exhibit average carrier lifetimes exceeding 13 ns, with suppressed non-radiative recombination rates attributed to reduced defect densities at both grain boundaries and surfaces. Furthermore, the discrete energy level structure in quantum dots can facilitate type-II band alignment (a configuration where electrons and holes are confined in different spatial regions) at heterointerfaces, creating favorable energy cascades for directional charge transfer while maintaining spatial separation of electrons and holes to minimize recombination losses.

==== Multiple exciton generation ====
Quantum confinement in perovskite nanocrystals also enables unique quantum mechanical processes that could exceed conventional efficiency limits. Multiple exciton generation (MEG), also termed carrier multiplication, represents a quantum mechanical process wherein the absorption of a single high-energy photon generates multiple electron-hole pairs rather than dissipating excess energy as heat. This phenomenon offers a pathway to exceed the Shockley-Queisser efficiency limit of approximately 33.7% for single-junction solar cells.

Perovskite quantum dots have demonstrated efficient MEG relative to other quantum dot systems, with lower threshold energies compared to conventional lead chalcogenide quantum dots. Formamidinium lead iodide (FAPbI_{3}) nanocrystals exhibit MEG thresholds as low as 2.25 E.g. (where E.g. is the bandgap energy) and MEG slope efficiencies (the rate at which additional excitons are generated per unit energy above threshold) reaching 75%. These values represent lower threshold energies than conventional lead sulfide (PbS) or lead selenide (PbSe) quantum dots, which typically require threshold energies exceeding 3 Eg.

The enhanced MEG efficiency in perovskites stems from their unique electronic properties, including small and nearly equal effective masses for electrons and holes, slow hot carrier cooling rates (on the order of picoseconds rather than femtoseconds), and strong Coulomb interactions enhanced by quantum confinement. The MEG process occurs via an inverse Auger mechanism (a process where electron-hole recombination energy is transferred to generate additional carriers, also known as impact ionization) within approximately 90 femtoseconds of photoexcitation, competing favorably with phonon-mediated cooling pathways. Theoretical calculations predict that efficient MEG with a 2 E.g. threshold could increase maximum solar cell efficiency from 33.7% to over 40% under AM1.5 illumination, although practical implementation in complete devices remains an active area of research.

==== Stability improvements ====
While quantum dots offer pathways to enhanced efficiency, they also demonstrate several mechanisms for improved device stability. Perovskite quantum dots demonstrate enhanced stability relative to bulk polycrystalline films, addressing moisture sensitivity, phase instability, and photodegradation pathways that limit bulk device operational lifetimes. The nanoscale dimensions create substantial surface energy contributions that thermodynamically stabilize the photoactive cubic α-phase of CsPbI_{3} at room temperature. In contrast, bulk films spontaneously convert to the non-photoactive orthorhombic δ-phase under ambient conditions. This phase stabilization arises from surface strain imparted by organic ligands (typically oleic acid and oleylamine) that induces lattice compression favoring the desired perovskite structure.

Surface passivation by ligands simultaneously addresses multiple degradation pathways. Strongly bound phosphine oxide or carboxylic acid groups coordinate with undercoordinated lead atoms, eliminating surface trap states that would otherwise facilitate non-radiative recombination and serve as nucleation sites for decomposition. Calculations indicate that ligands with phosphorus-oxygen double bonds form particularly stable interactions with surface lead, with binding energies of approximately -1.1 eV, creating robust passivation layers that resist ligand loss under electric fields and block ion migration channels.

Ion migration—a major instability mechanism in bulk perovskites where mobile halide anions and lead cations create time-dependent electric fields and compositional inhomogeneities—is substantially suppressed in quantum dots due to the reduced volume available for ion transport and the presence of energy barriers at numerous quantum dot interfaces. The compositional flexibility of perovskite quantum dots enables A-site cation engineering to further optimize thermal stability. Formamidinium-containing quantum dots exhibit stronger ligand binding and higher decomposition temperatures compared to pure cesium compositions, although the degradation mechanisms differ: phase transition for Cs-rich versus direct decomposition for FA-rich compositions. Recent encapsulation strategies combining bilateral surface passivation and self-healing polymers have demonstrated quantum dot devices maintaining over 95% of initial efficiency after 100 hours of continuous operation.

==== Current performance and challenges ====
Despite advances in both efficiency mechanisms and stability, quantum dot devices face technical and economic hurdles before widespread adoption. Perovskite quantum dot solar cells have achieved significant efficiency increases, with certified power conversion efficiency (PCE) reaching 18.30% for CsPbI_{3}-based devices as of 2024. This represents the highest efficiency among colloidal quantum dot solar cells of any composition. This milestone builds upon steady progress from initial efficiencies below 10% in 2016 to over 15% by 2021, achieved through advances in surface ligand engineering, phase stability control, and interfacial architecture design.

The champion devices employ short-chain ligands or ligand-exchange strategies that enhance electronic coupling between quantum dots while maintaining surface passivation, resulting in balanced improvements in open-circuit voltage (exceeding 1.15 V), short-circuit current density (14–15 mA/cm^{2}), and fill factors (approaching 80–85%). Flexible quantum dot photovoltaics have demonstrated efficiencies up to 12.3%, substantially higher than flexible devices based on other quantum dot materials. For comparison, bulk perovskite solar cells have surpassed 25% efficiency in single-junction architectures, indicating that quantum dot devices currently achieve approximately 7 percentage points lower absolute efficiency.

The efficiency gap reflects several persistent challenges. Charge transport in quantum dot films remains fundamentally limited by inter-dot hopping barriers created by surface ligands and quantum confinement potential differences, resulting in mobilities of 0.2–0.5 cm^{2} V^{−1} s^{−1}, substantially lower than bulk perovskite thin films at 2–10 cm^{2} V^{−1} s^{−1}. Surface trap states, despite passivation efforts, continue to cause non-radiative recombination losses that reduce photocurrent collection, particularly in thicker absorber layers required for complete light harvesting.

Scalability presents significant technoeconomic barriers. Current hot-injection synthesis methods yield only 10–50% of theoretical quantum dot output due to colloidal instability during purification, and synthesis costs exceed $50 per square meter of device area at laboratory scale. Manufacturing cost models indicate that achieving commercial viability (below $5/m^{2}) requires simultaneous advances in synthesis yield (exceeding 75%), solvent recycling infrastructure, and automated production systems. Long-term operational stability under realistic conditions (elevated temperature, humidity, continuous illumination) remains inadequately characterized, with most studies limited to controlled laboratory environments and timeframes below 1000 hours.

Future development pathways include integration into tandem architectures where the wide, tunable bandgap of perovskite quantum dots (1.75–2.1 eV) complements narrow-bandgap silicon (1.1 eV) or lead sulfide quantum dot (0.9–1.0 eV) bottom cells. Theoretical modeling predicts four-terminal perovskite quantum dot/silicon tandem efficiencies exceeding 28%, while two-terminal monolithic designs could reach 29–30% with optimized intermediate recombination layers. All-perovskite tandem cells employing wide-bandgap quantum dot top cells paired with narrow-bandgap bulk perovskite bottom cells represent another avenue under investigation.

=== Other research ===
Solar cells based on transition metal oxide perovskites and heterostructures thereof such as LaVO_{3}/SrTiO_{3} have been studied.

Rice University scientists discovered a novel phenomenon of light-induced lattice expansion in perovskite materials.

Perovskite quantum dot solar cell technology may extend cell durability, which remains a critical limitation.

In order to overcome the instability issues with lead-based organic perovskite materials in ambient air and reduce the use of lead, perovskite derivatives, such as Cs_{2}SnI_{6} double perovskite, have been investigated.

== Processing ==
Perovskite solar cells hold an advantage over traditional silicon solar cells in the simplicity of their processing and their tolerance to internal defects. Traditional silicon cells require expensive, multi-step processes, conducted at high temperatures (>1000 °C) under high vacuum in special cleanroom facilities. Meanwhile, the hybrid organic-inorganic perovskite material can be manufactured with simpler wet chemistry techniques in a traditional lab environment. Most notably, methylammonium and formamidinium lead trihalides, also known as hybrid perovskites, have been created using a variety of solution deposition techniques, such as spin coating, slot-die coating, blade coating, spray coating, inkjet printing, screen printing, electrodeposition, and vapor deposition techniques, all of which have the potential to be scaled up with relative ease except spin coating. All these methods seek to ensure a perovskite layer achieves full surface coverage by limiting growth rate and increasing nucleation.

=== Deposition methods ===
The solution-based processing method can be classified into one-step solution deposition and two-step solution deposition. In one-step deposition, a perovskite precursor solution that is prepared by mixing lead halide and organic halide together, is directly deposited through various coating methods, such as spin coating, spraying, blade coating, and slot-die coating, to form perovskite film. One-step deposition is simple, fast, and inexpensive but it's also more challenging to control the perovskite film uniformity and quality. In the two-step deposition, the lead halide film is first deposited then reacts with organic halide to form perovskite film. The reaction takes time to complete but it can be facilitated by adding Lewis-bases or partial organic halide into lead halide precursors. In two-step deposition method, the volume expansion during the conversion of lead halide to perovskite can fill any pinholes to realize a better film quality. The vapor phase deposition processes can be categorized into physical vapor deposition (PVD) and chemical vapor deposition (CVD). PVD refers to the evaporation of a perovskite or its precursor to form a thin perovskite film on the substrate, which is free of solvent. While CVD involves the reaction of organic halide vapor with the lead halide thin film to convert it into the perovskite film. A solution-based CVD, aerosol-assisted CVD (AACVD) was also introduced to fabricate halide perovskite films, such as CH_{3}NH_{3}PbI_{3}, CH_{3}NH_{3}PbBr_{3}, and Cs_{2}SnI_{6}.

==== One-step solution deposition ====
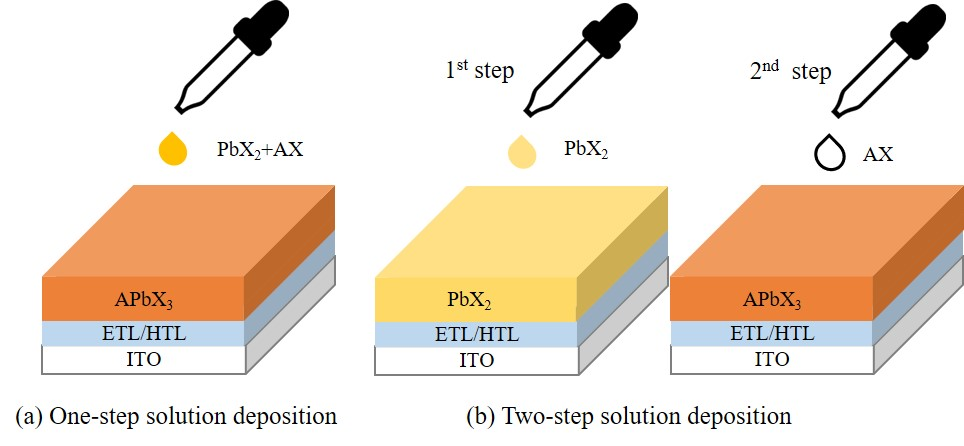
One-step solution deposition vs two-step solution deposition

In one-step solution processing, a lead halide and a methylammonium halide can be dissolved in a solvent and spin coated onto a substrate. Subsequent evaporation and convective self-assembly during spinning results in dense layers of well crystallized perovskite material, due to the strong ionic interactions within the material (The organic component also contributes to a lower crystallization temperature). Precise control of crystal growth is essential to achieve high quality perovskite films. The rate of crystallization can be controlled by a method that involves Lewis acid-base adduct formation. By adding base molecules in a stoichiometric ratio with perovskite precursors, electron pair donors such as sulfur or oxygen can, for example, make adducts with PbX_{2}, a strong Lewis acid. By elevating the solubility of lead halides, these acid-base adducts can slow the nucleation process and speed of crystal growth, achieving more homogeneous and performant perovskite layers. However, simple spin-coating does not yield homogenous layers, instead requiring the addition of other chemicals such as GBL, DMSO, and toluene drips. These antisolvent compounds that are completely soluble in host solvents, have high dielectric constants and boiling points tend to form superior quality films based on nucleation and substrate coverage. Other strongly basic S-donors such as thiourea similarly improved FA-based perovskite layer formation. Simple solution processing results in the presence of voids, platelets, and other defects in the layer, which would hinder the efficiency of a solar cell.

Another technique using room temperature solvent-solvent extraction produces high-quality crystalline films with precise control over thickness down to 20 nanometers across areas several centimeters square without generating pinholes. In this method "perovskite precursors are dissolved in a solvent called NMP and coated onto a substrate. Then, instead of heating, the substrate is bathed in diethyl ether, a second solvent that selectively grabs the NMP solvent and whisks it away. What's left is an ultra-smooth film of perovskite crystals."

In another solution processed method, the mixture of lead iodide and methylammonium halide dissolved in DMF is preheated. Then the mixture is spin coated on a substrate maintained at higher temperature. This method produces uniform films of up to 1 mm grain size.

Pb halide perovskites can be fabricated from a PbI_{2} precursor, or non-PbI_{2} precursors, such as PbCl_{2}, Pb(Ac)_{2}, and Pb(SCN)_{2}, giving films different properties.

==== Two-step solution deposition ====
In 2015, a new approach for forming the PbI_{2} nanostructure and the use of high CH_{3}NH_{3}I concentration have been adopted to form high quality (large crystal size and smooth) perovskite film with better photovoltaic performances. On one hand, self-assembled porous PbI_{2} is formed by incorporating small amounts of rationally chosen additives into the PbI_{2} precursor solutions, which significantly facilitate the conversion of perovskite without any PbI_{2} residue. On the other hand, through employing a relatively high CH_{3}NH_{3}I concentration, a firmly crystallized and uniform CH_{3}NH_{3}PbI_{3} film is formed. Furthermore, this is an inexpensive approach. N-donors, such as pyridine (Py) additives have shown promise in the last few years to fabricate MAPbI_{3}. After spin coating PbI_{2}, pyridine vapor is introduced which leads to the formation of nanostructured PbI_{2}(Py)_{2} films at room temperature. This is represented by the equation PbI_{2} (s) + 2Py (g) ↔ PbI_{2}(Py)_{2} (s). The second phase involves dipping the porous films into a CH_{3}NH_{3}I solution which can be represented by the equation PbI_{2}·(Py)_{2} (s) CH_{3}NH_{3}I (aq) → CH_{3}NH_{3}PbI_{3} (s) + 2Py (aq) where the previously intercalated pyridine molecules are replaced by CH_{3}NH_{3}I leading to a uniform morphology and full surface coverage.

==== Vapor deposition ====
In vapor assisted techniques, spin coated or exfoliated lead halide is annealed in the presence of methylammonium iodide vapor at a temperature of around 150 °C. This technique holds an advantage over solution processing, as it opens up the possibility for multi-stacked thin films over larger areas. This could be applicable for the production of multi-junction cells. Additionally, vapor deposited techniques result in less thickness variation than simple solution processed layers. However, both techniques can result in planar thin film layers or for use in mesoscopic designs, such as coatings on a metal oxide scaffold. Such a design is common for current perovskite or dye-sensitized solar cells.

=== Scalability ===
Scalability includes not only scaling up the perovskite absorber layer, but also scaling up charge-transport layers and electrode. Both solution and vapor processes hold promise in terms of scalability. Process cost and complexity is significantly less than that of silicon solar cells. Vapor deposition or vapor assisted techniques reduce the need for use of further solvents, which reduces the risk of solvent remnants. Solution processing is cheaper. Current issues with perovskite solar cells revolve around stability, as the material is observed to degrade in standard environmental conditions, suffering drops in efficiency (See also Stability).

In 2014, Olga Malinkiewicz presented her inkjet printing manufacturing process for perovskite sheets in Boston (US) during the MRS fall meeting – for which she received MIT Technology review's innovators under 35 award. The University of Toronto also claims to have developed a low-cost Inkjet solar cell in which the perovskite raw materials are blended into a Nanosolar 'ink' which can be applied by an inkjet printer onto glass, plastic or other substrate materials.

==== Scaling up the absorber layer ====
In order to scale up the perovskite layer while maintaining high efficiency, various techniques have been developed to coat the perovskite film more uniformly. For example, some physical approaches are developed to promote supersaturation through rapid solvent removal, thus getting more nucleations and reducing grain growth time and solute migration. Heating, gas flow, vacuum, and anti-solvent can all assist solvent removal. And chemical additives, such as chloride additives, Lewis base additives, surfactant additive, and surface modification, can influence the crystal growth to control the film morphology. For example, a recent report of surfactant additive, such as L-α-phosphatidylcholine (LP), demonstrated the suppression of solution flow by surfactants to eliminate gaps between islands and meanwhile the surface wetting improvement of perovskite ink on the hydrophobic substrate to ensure a full coverage. Besides, LP can also passivate charge traps to further enhance the device performance, which can be used in blade coating to get a high-throughput of PSCs with minimal efficiency loss.

==== Scaling up the charge-transport layer ====
Scaling up the charge-transport layer is also necessary for the scalability of PSCs. Common electron transport layer (ETL) in n-i-p PSCs are TiO_{2}, SnO_{2} and ZnO. Currently, to make TiO_{2} layer deposition be compatible with flexible polymer substrate, low-temperature techniques, such as atomic layer deposition, molecular layer deposition, hydrothermal reaction, and electrodeposition, are developed to deposit compact TiO_{2} layer in large area. Same methods also apply to SnO_{2} deposition. As for hole transport layer (HTL), instead of commonly used PEDOT:PSS, NiO_{x} is used as an alternative due to the water absorption of PEDOT, which can be deposited through room-temperature solution processing. CuSCN and NiO are alternative HTL materials which can be deposited by spray coating, blade coating, and electrodeposition, which are potentially scalable. Researchers also report a molecular doping method for scalable blading to make HTL-free PSCs.

==== Scaling up the back electrode ====
Evaporation deposition of back electrode is mature and scalable but it requires vacuum. Vacuum-free deposition of back electrode is important for full solution processibility of PSCs. Silver electrodes can be screen-printed, and silver nanowire network can be spray-coated as back electrode. Carbon is also a potential candidate as scalable PSCs electrode, due to its high abundance and low cost, compared to noble metal-based electrodes. Materials such as graphite, carbon nanotubes, and graphene have been used as back electrodes. Carbon electrodes can be fabricated by high-throughput methods with lower running costs, such as screen-printing, blade-coating, and roll-to-roll coating.

Recent work has strengthened the case for roll-to-roll (R2R) manufacture of perovskite solar cells by demonstrating both fully printed flexible modules under ambient room conditions and groove-based back-contact modules fabricated by R2R slot-die coating. In the 2024 report, entirely R2R-fabricated modules reached power conversion efficiencies of up to 15.5% for individual small-area cells and 11.0% for serially interconnected large-area modules, highlighting the potential of continuous, industry-relevant processing routes for perovskite photovoltaic manufacture.

== Toxicity ==
Toxicity issues associated with the lead content in perovskite solar cells strains the public perception and acceptance of the technology. The health and environmental impact of toxic heavy metals has been much debated in the case of CdTe solar cells, whose efficiency became industrially relevant in the 1990s. Although CdTe is a thermally and chemically very stable compound with a low solubility product (K_{sp}, of 10^{−34}) and, accordingly, its toxicity was revealed to be extremely low, rigorous industrial hygiene programmes and recycling commitment programmes have been implemented. In contrast to CdTe, hybrid perovskites are very unstable and easily degrade to rather soluble compounds of Pb or Sn with K_{SP}=4.4×10^{−9,} which significantly increases their potential bioavailability and hazard for human health, as confirmed by recent toxicological studies. Although the 50% lethal dose of lead [LD_{50}(Pb)] is less than 5 mg per kg of body weight, health issues arise at much lower exposure levels. Young children absorb 4–5 times as much lead as adults and are most susceptible to the adverse effects of lead. In 2003, a maximum blood Pb level (BLL) of 5 μg/dL was imposed by the World Health Organization, which corresponds to the amount of Pb contained in only 25 mm^{2} of the perovskite solar module. Furthermore, the BLL of 5 μg/dL was revoked in 2010 after the discovery of decreased intelligence and behavioral difficulties in children exposed to even lower values. Recently, Hong Zhang et al. reported a universal co-solvent dilution strategy to significantly reduce the toxic lead waste production, the usage of perovskite materials as well as the fabrication cost by 70%, which also delivers PCEs of over 24% and 18.45% in labotorary cells and modules, respectively.

=== Reducing lead toxicity ===
==== Replacing lead in perovskites ====
Various studies have been performed to analyze promising alternatives to lead perovskite for use in PSCs. Good candidates for replacement, which ideally have low toxicity, narrow direct bandgaps, high optical absorption coefficients, high carrier mobility, and good charge transport properties, include tin/germanium-halide perovskites, double perovskites, and bismuth/antimony-halides with perovskite-like structures.

Research done on tin halide-based PSCs show that they have a lower power conversion efficiency (PCE), with those fabricated experimentally achieving a PCE of 9.6%. This relatively low PCE is in part due to the oxidation of Sn^{2+} to Sn^{4+}, which will act as a p-type dopant in the structure and result in higher dark carrier concentration and increased carrier recombination rates. Germanium halide perovskites have proven similarly unsuccessful due to low efficiencies and issues with oxidising tendencies, with one experimental solar cells displaying a PCE of only 0.11%. Higher PCEs have been reported from some germanium tin alloy-based perovskites, however, with an all-inorganic CsSn_{0.5}Ge_{0.5}I_{3} film having a reported PCE of 7.11%. In addition to this higher efficiency, the germanium tin alloy perovskites have also been found to have high photostability.

Apart from the Tin and Germanium based perovskites, there has also been research on the viability of double-perovskites with the formula of A_{2}M^{+}M^{3+}X_{6}. While these double-perovskites have a favorable bandgap of approximately 2 eV and exhibit good stability, several issues including high electron/hole effective masses and the presence of indirect bandgaps result in lowered carrier mobility and charge transport. Research exploring the viability of Bismuth/Antimony halides in replacing lead perovskites has also been done, particularly with Cs_{3}Sb_{2}I_{9} and Cs_{3}Bi_{2}I_{9}, which also have bandgaps of approximately 2 eV. Experimental results have also shown that, while Antimony and Bismuth halide-based PSCs have good stability, their low carrier mobilities and poor charge transport properties restrict their viability in replacing lead-based perovskites.

==== Encapsulation to reduce lead leakage ====
Recent research into the usage of encapsulation as a method for reducing lead leakage has been conducted, particularly focusing on the utilization of self-healing polymers. Research has been done on two promising polymers, Surlyn and a thermal crosslinking epoxy-resin, diglycidyl ether bisphenol A:n-octylamine:m-xylylenediamine = 4:2:1. Experiments showed a substantial reduction in lead leakage from PSCs using these self-healing polymers under simulated sunny weather conditions and after simulated hail damage had cracked the outer glass encapsulation. Notably, the epoxy-resin encapsulation was able to reduce lead leakage by a factor of 375 times when heated by simulated sunlight.

==== Coatings to adsorb lead leakage ====
Chemically lead-binding coatings have also been employed experimentally to reduce lead leakage from PSCs. In particular, Cation Exchange Resins (CERs) and P,P′-di(2-ethylhexyl)methanediphosphonic acid (DMDP) have been employed experimentally in this effort. Both coatings work similarly, chemically sequestering lead that might leak from a PSC module after weather damage occurs. Research into CERs has shown that, through diffusion-controlled processes, Pb^{2+} lead is effectively adsorbed and bonded onto the surface of CERs, even in the presence of competing divalent ions such as Mg^{2+} and Ca^{2+} that might also occupy binding sites on the CER surface.

To test the efficacy of CER-based coatings in adsorbing lead in practical conditions, researchers dripped slightly acidic water, meant to simulate rainwater, onto a PSC module cracked by simulated hail damage. Researchers found that by applying a CER coating onto the copper electrodes of damaged PSC modules, lead leakage was reduced by 84%. When the CER was integrated into a carbon-based electrode paste applied to PSC and on the top of the encapsulating glass, the lead leakage decreased by 98%. A similar test was also performed on a PSC module with DMDP coated on both the top and bottom of the module to study the efficacy of DMDP in reducing lead leakage. In this test, the module was cracked by simulated hail damage, and placed in a solution of acidic water containing aqueous Ca^{2+} ions, meant to simulate acidic rain with low levels of aqueous Calcium present. The lead concentration of acidic water was tracked, and researchers found that the lead sequestration efficiency of the DMDP coating at room temperature 96.1%.

==== Reducing the usage of lead materials during device fabrication ====
A co-solvent dilution strategy has been reported to obtain high-quality perovskite films with very low concentration precursor solutions. This strategy substantially reduces the quantity of expensive raw materials in the perovskite precursor ink and reduces the toxic waste production by spin coating through two key routes: minimizing precursor loss during the processing of perovskite films and enhancing the lifetime and shelf-life of the inks by suppressing aggregation of precursor colloids. A PCE of over 24% for laboratory PSCs could be achieved with a co-solvent dilution to a level as low as 0.5 M. In addition, scalability of the co-solvent dilution strategy is tested via fabrication of perovskite solar modules (PSMs) with different sizes using industrial spin coating. The modules fabricated by co-solvent dilution strategy show higher PCEs and far better uniformity and reproducibility than modules prepared with conventional perovskite inks, whilst using a fraction of the precursor. Importantly, more than 70% toxic waste/solvent, perovskite raw material, and fabrication cost are projected to be reduced for module fabrication compared to the same modules made using conventional inks by industrial spin coating, and in doing so make spin coating a sustainable technique for medium scale manufacturing, for instance, for standalone modules or Si wafer-scale integration. This work shows that through judicious selection of a greener co-solvent, we can significantly reduce the usage and waste of toxic solvents and perovskite raw materials, while also simplifying fabrication and cutting costs of PSCs.

Recycling end of life waste

Concerns over lead toxicity and end-of-life waste have prompted growing research on sustainable recycling methods for PSCs. By recovering PbI₂ from spent perovskite layers and reclaiming costly charge-transport materials, lead pollution can be reduced, sustainability improved, and perovskite technology made more suitable for large-scale deployment. As a result, manufacturers are increasingly expected to develop effective recycling strategies for photovoltaic waste. Current recycling approaches typically rely on layer-by-layer dissolution using hazardous organic solvents, raising additional environmental and safety concerns. These limitations have motivated efforts to design green-solvent-based recycling methods that minimize environmental impact and support a more circular perovskite solar economy.

Current research on perovskite solar cell (PSC) recycling has focused on the use of green solvents to recover and reuse valuable components. A study published in Nature in 2025 (Volume 638) by Xun Xiao and Niansheng Xu employs an aqueous-based solvent system and a holistic approach to recover all critical PSC components. In this work, lead iodide is chemically dissolved via coordination with acetate ions, which facilitates the selective extraction of Pb²⁺ from the perovskite lattice. The dissolved perovskite is then recrystallized to regenerate high-quality crystals, and the recovered material is stabilized and tested for thermal stress to evaluate durability. Additionally, the hole-transport layer material, spiro-OMeTAD, is recovered using a green-solvent mixture of ethyl acetate and ethanol. The study reports that recycled perovskites maintain high device performance, achieving an average power conversion efficiency of 21.9 ± 1.1% and a champion efficiency of 23.4%, corresponding to over 99% recovery relative to devices made from fresh materials (22.1 ± 0.9%). Life-cycle assessment demonstrates that this recycling strategy substantially reduces human toxicity from PSCs (68.8% reduction in cancer-related effects and 57.6% in non-cancer effects) compared with landfilling. Moreover, the holistic recovery approach minimizes virgin material demand, decreasing resource depletion by 96.6%. Techno-economic analysis further indicates that the strategy can reduce the levelized cost of electricity (LCOE) by 18.8% to 4.05 ± 0.13 cents/kWh for three-time recycling, with even greater benefits for shorter system lifetimes, highlighting the method's environmental and economic advantages.

In another study, Larini et al. (2025) developed a green-solvent recycling strategy that refurbishes SnO₂, PbI₂, and Spiro-OMeTAD while retaining 98.4% of the initial device efficiency. The method involves reformulating a perovskite precursor solution, redepositing it onto the SnO₂ layer via spin coating with an antisolvent step to control crystallization, and thermal annealing. Spiro-OMeTAD is selectively dissolved in ethyl acetate and purified through aqueous extraction and solvent evaporation to remove dopants. The study also included a life-cycle assessment, further quantifying the environmental advantages of this recycling approach.

Despite promising results, significant gaps remain in perovskite solar cell recycling research. Key uncertainties include the scalability of laboratory-scale methods, the energy and cost requirements for large-scale dissolution and recrystallization, and the long-term reliability and performance of recycled materials under real-world conditions such as outdoor weathering and moisture exposure. Further studies are needed to optimize these processes and validate their effectiveness for commercial deployment.

== Physics ==
An important characteristic of the most commonly used perovskite system, the methylammonium lead halides, is a bandgap controllable by the halide content. The materials also display a diffusion length for both holes and electrons of over one micron. The long diffusion length means that these materials can function effectively in a thin-film architecture, and that charges can be transported in the perovskite itself over long distances. It has recently been reported that charges in the perovskite material are predominantly present as free electrons and holes, rather than as bound excitons, since the exciton binding energy is low enough to enable charge separation at room temperature.

=== Efficiency limits ===
Perovskite solar cell bandgaps are tunable and can be optimised for the solar spectrum by altering the halide content in the film (i.e., by mixing I and Br). The Shockley–Queisser limit radiative efficiency limit, also known as the detailed balance limit, is about 31% under an AM1.5G solar spectrum at 1000 W/m^{2}, for a Perovskite bandgap of 1.55 eV. This is slightly smaller than the radiative limit of gallium arsenide of bandgap 1.42 eV which can reach a radiative efficiency of 33%.

Values of the detailed balance limit are available in tabulated form and a MATLAB program for implementing the detailed balance model has been written.

In the meantime, the drift-diffusion model has found to successfully predict the efficiency limit of perovskite solar cells, which enable us to understand the device physics in-depth, especially the radiative recombination limit and selective contact on device performance. There are two prerequisites for predicting and approaching the perovskite efficiency limit. First, the intrinsic radiative recombination needs to be corrected after adopting optical designs which will significantly affect the open-circuit voltage at its Shockley–Queisser limit. Second, the contact characteristics of the electrodes need to be carefully engineered to eliminate the charge accumulation and surface recombination at the electrodes. With the two procedures, the accurate prediction of efficiency limit and precise evaluation of efficiency degradation for perovskite solar cells are attainable by the drift-diffusion model.

Along with detailed balance analysis and drift-diffusion calculations, there have been many first principle studies to find the characteristics of the perovskite material numerically. These include but are not limited to bandgap, effective mass, and defect levels for different perovskite materials. Also there have some efforts to cast light on the device mechanism based on simulations where Agrawal et al. suggests a modeling framework, presents analysis of near ideal efficiency, and talks about the importance of interface of perovskite and hole/electron transport layers.

Additionally, circuit model has been developed for describing the current density-voltage characteristics of perovskite solar cells. Sun et al. tries to come up with a compact model for perovskite different structures based on experimental transport data. Minshen Lin et al. proposed a modified diode model to quantify the efficiency loss of perovskite solar cells.

== Architectures ==
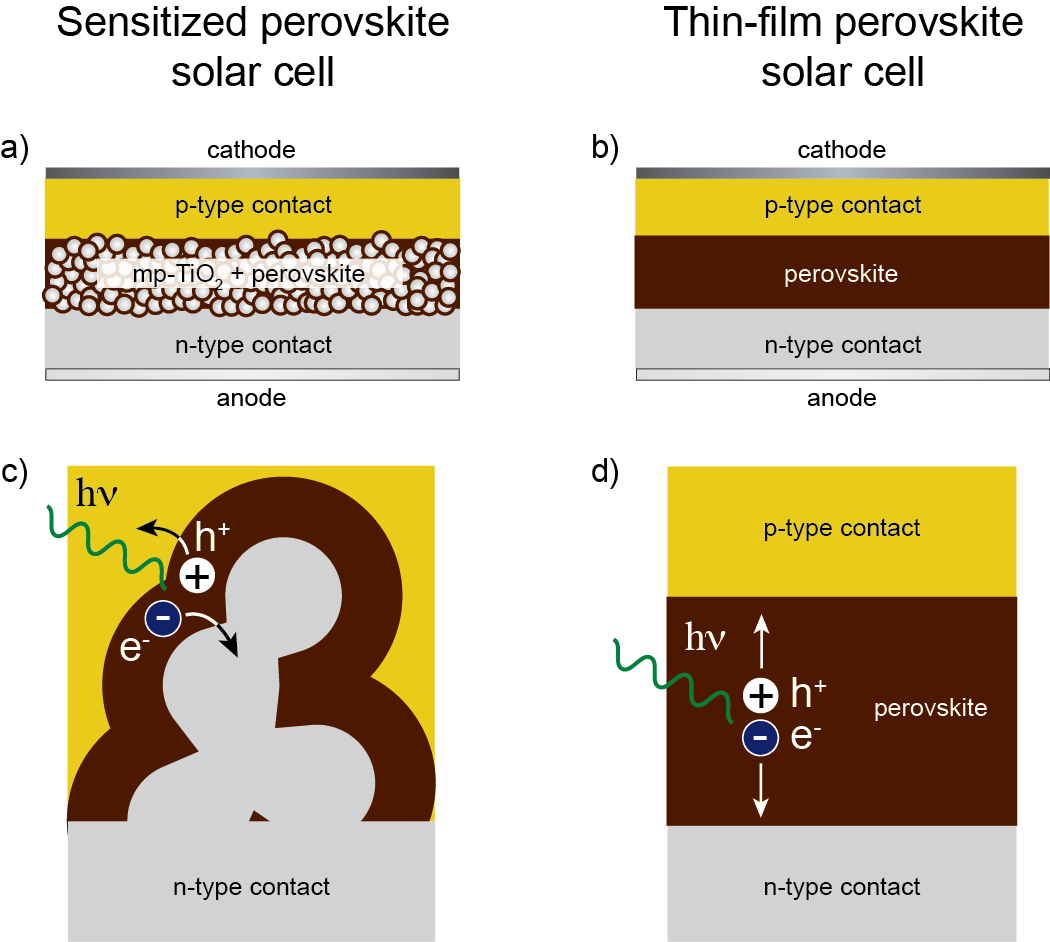
Schematic of a sensitized perovskite solar cell in which the active layer consist of a layer of mesoporous TiO_{2} which is coated with the perovskite absorber. The active layer is contacted with an n-type material for electron extraction and a p-type material for hole extraction. b) Schematic of a thin-film perovskite solar cell. In this architecture in which just a flat layer of perovskite is sandwiched between two selective contacts. c) Charge generation and extraction in the sensitized architecture. After light absorption in the perovskite absorber the photogenerated electron is injected into the mesoporous TiO_{2} through which it is extracted. The concomitantly generated hole is transferred to the p-type material. d) Charge generation and extraction in the thin-film architecture. After light absorption both charge generation as well as charge extraction occurs in the perovskite layer.

Perovskite solar cells function efficiently in a number of somewhat different architectures depending either on the role of the perovskite material in the device, or the nature of the top and bottom electrode. Devices in which positive charges are extracted by the transparent bottom electrode (cathode), can predominantly be divided into 'sensitized', where the perovskite functions mainly as a light absorber, and charge transport occurs in other materials, or 'thin-film', where most electron or hole transport occurs in the bulk of the perovskite itself. Similar to the sensitization in dye-sensitized solar cells, the perovskite material is coated onto a charge-conducting mesoporous scaffold – most commonly TiO_{2} – as light-absorber. The photogenerated electrons are transferred from the perovskite layer to the mesoporous sensitized layer through which they are transported to the electrode and extracted into the circuit. The thin film solar cell architecture is based on the finding that perovskite materials can also act as highly efficient, ambipolar charge-conductor.

After light absorption and the subsequent charge-generation, both negative and positive charge carrier are transported through the perovskite to charge selective contacts. Perovskite solar cells emerged from the field of dye-sensitized solar cells, so the sensitized architecture was that initially used, but over time it has become apparent that they function well, if not ultimately better, in a thin-film architecture. More recently, some researchers also successfully demonstrated the possibility of fabricating flexible devices with perovskites, which makes it more promising for flexible energy demand. Certainly, the aspect of UV-induced degradation in the sensitized architecture may be detrimental for the important aspect of long-term stability.

There is another different class of architectures, in which the transparent electrode at the bottom acts as cathode by collecting the photogenerated p-type charge carriers.

Perovskite solar cells are commonly classified as either n–i–p or p–i–n according to the order of the charge-selective layers around the intrinsic perovskite absorber. In n–i–p devices, an electron-transport layer is deposited beneath the perovskite and a hole-transport layer above it, whereas in p–i–n devices this sequence is reversed; both architectures are widely used, with p–i–n structures often favored for low-temperature processing and tandem integration. A further variant is the back-contact architecture, in which both selective contacts are patterned on the same side of the device so that charge extraction occurs laterally rather than through a conventional sandwich stack. Back-contact perovskite solar cells have been demonstrated in flexible groove-based micro-modules and, more recently, in roll-to-roll slot-die-coated modules, highlighting their potential as a manufacturing-compatible architecture.

=== Research and development tools and methods ===
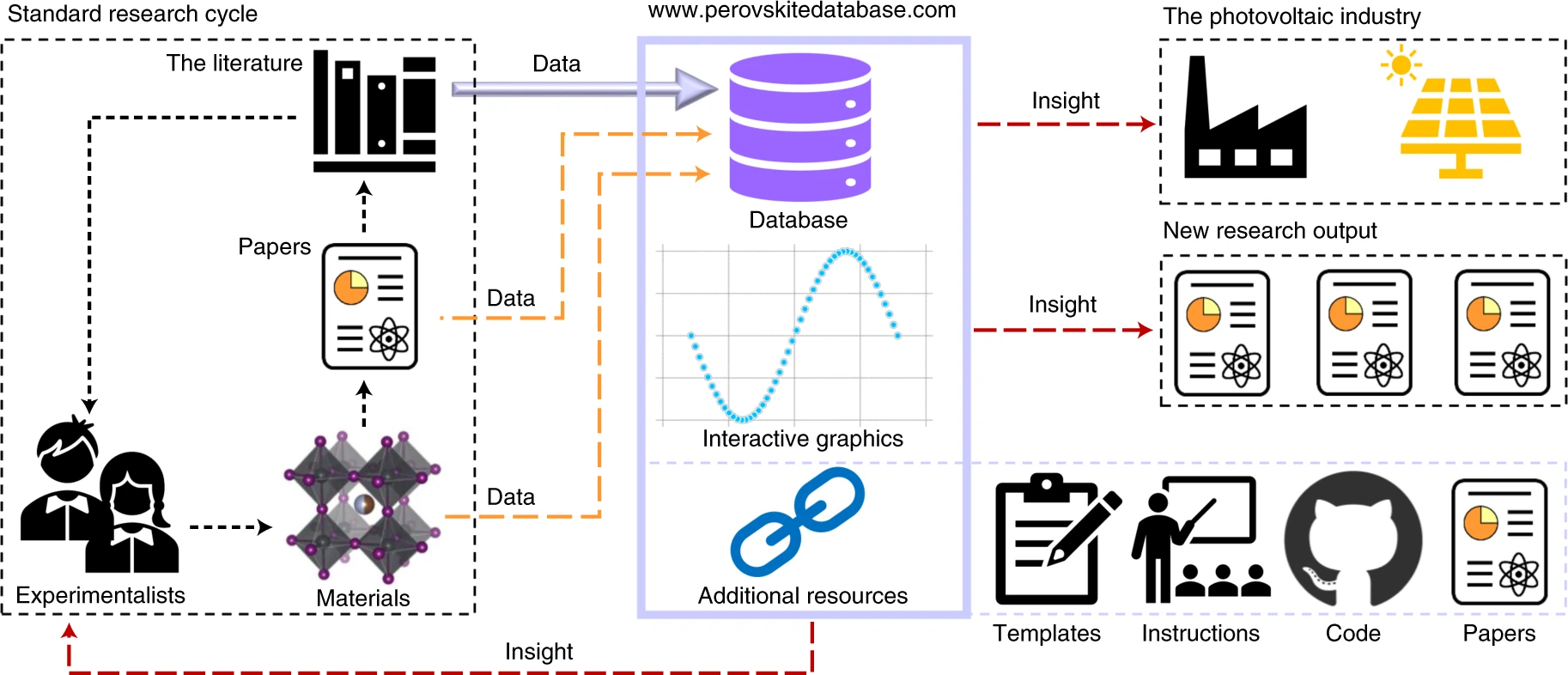
Schema of how the open database, interactive visualization tools, protocols and a metadata ontology for reporting device data, open-source code for data analysis, etc. can support PSC development

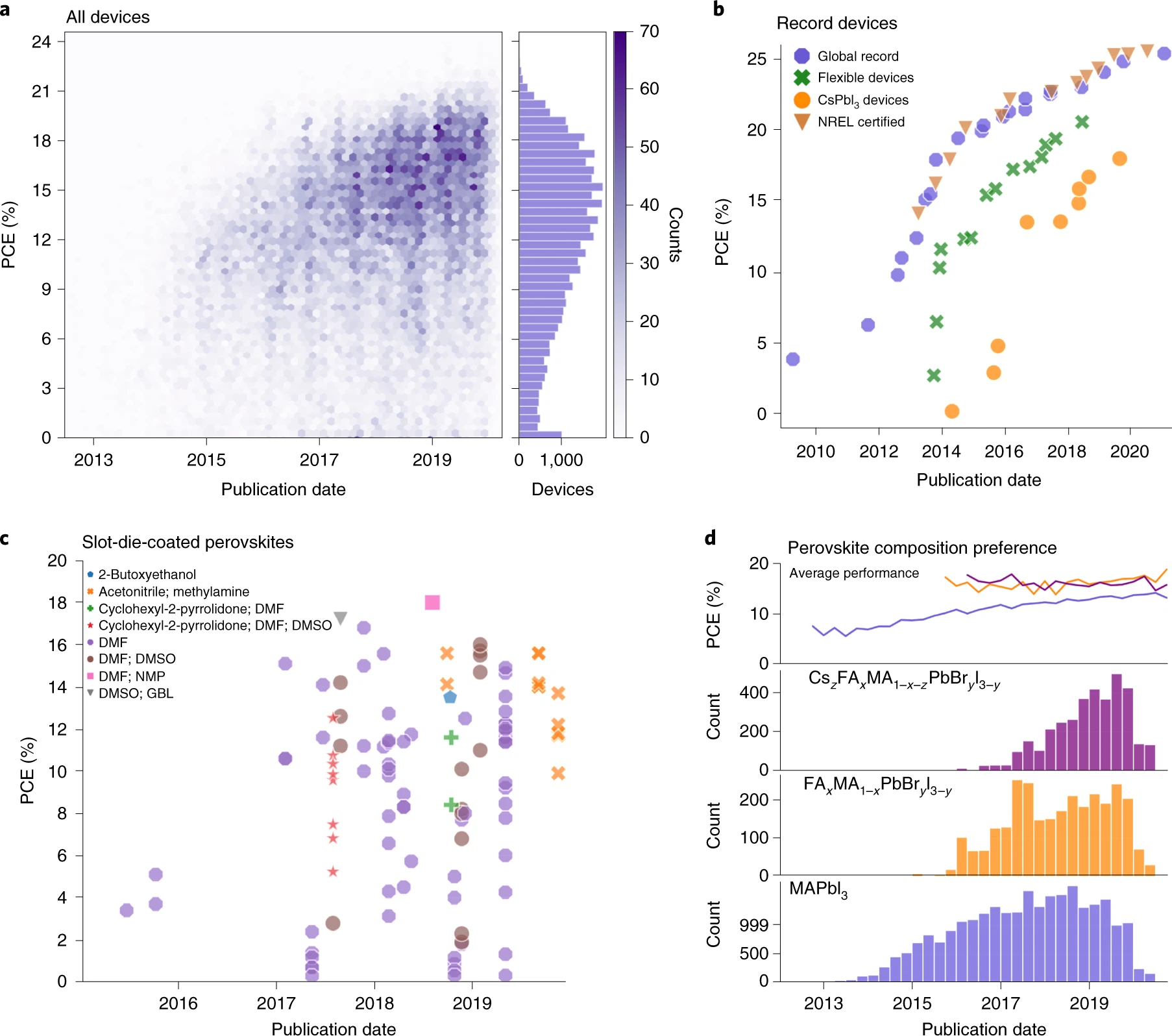
Example of analysis from the database; in the initial version one can display "the performance evolution of, for example, flexible cells, cells based on CsPbI_{3} or cells fulfilling any combination of constraints" with a click.

The Perovskite Database is a database and analysis tool of perovskite solar cells research data which systematically integrates over 15,000 publications, in particular device-data about "over 42,400" perovskite devices. Authors described the FAIR open database site – which as of January 2022 requires signing up to access the data and uses software that is partly open source but not marked as having a free software license on GitHub – as a participative "Wikipedia for perovskite solar cell research". It allows data to be filtered and displayed according to various criteria such as material compositions or component type and could thereby support the development of optimal architecture designs (including the materials used).

High-throughput screening of mixtures and contact layers is one development mechanism that has been used to develop relatively stable perovskite solar cells.

== History ==
Perovskite materials have been well known for many years, but the first incorporation into a solar cell was reported by Tsutomu Miyasaka et al. in 2009. This was based on a dye-sensitized solar cell architecture, and generated only 3.8% power conversion efficiency (PCE) with a thin layer of perovskite on mesoporous TiO_{2} as electron-collector. Moreover, because a liquid corrosive electrolyte was used, the cell was only stable for a few minutes. Nam-Gyu Park et al. improved upon this in 2011, using the same dye-sensitized concept, achieving 6.5% PCE.

A breakthrough came in 2012, when Mike Lee and Henry Snaith from the University of Oxford realised that the perovskite was stable if contacted with a solid-state hole transporter such as spiro-OMeTAD and did not require the mesoporous TiO_{2} layer in order to transport electrons. They showed that efficiencies of almost 10% were achievable using the 'sensitized' TiO_{2} architecture with the solid-state hole transporter, but higher efficiencies, above 10%, were attained by replacing it with an inert scaffold. Further experiments in replacing the mesoporous TiO_{2} with Al_{2}O_{3} resulted in increased open-circuit voltage and a relative improvement in efficiency of 3–5% more than those with TiO_{2} scaffolds. This led to the hypothesis that a scaffold is not needed for electron extraction, which was later proved correct. This realisation was then closely followed by a demonstration that the perovskite itself could also transport holes, as well as electrons. A thin-film perovskite solar cell, with no mesoporous scaffold, of > 10% efficiency was achieved.

In 2013 both the planar and sensitized architectures saw a number of developments. Burschka et al. demonstrated a deposition technique for the sensitized architecture exceeding 15% efficiency by a two-step solution processing, At a similar time Olga Malinkiewicz et al., and Liu et al. showed that it was possible to fabricate planar solar cells by thermal co-evaporation, achieving more than 12% and 15% efficiency in a p-i-n and an n-i-p architecture respectively. Docampo et al. also showed that it was possible to fabricate perovskite solar cells in the typical 'organic solar cell' architecture, an 'inverted' configuration with the hole transporter below and the electron collector above the perovskite planar film.

A range of new deposition techniques and even higher efficiencies were reported in 2014. A reverse-scan efficiency of 19.3% was claimed by Yang Yang at UCLA using the planar thin-film architecture. In November 2014, a device by researchers from KRICT achieved a record with the certification of a non-stabilized efficiency of 20.1%.

Continuing the trend, a new record of efficiency for a single-junction perovskite solar cell efficiency was set each year since 2015, with the most frequent record-breakers coming from KRICT and UNIST. The latest record-holders are researchers from UNIST who achieved 25.7% efficiency. There are also efforts focused on reducing energy cost, including the Apolo project consortium at CEA laboratories which aims to bring the module cost below €0.40/Wp (Watt peak). At least since 2016, the records for perovskite-silicon tandem solar cells have consistently remained higher than the ones for single-junction cells. Since 2018 the records were interchangeably broken by Oxford Photovoltaics and researchers from Helmholtz-Zentrum Berlin. In 2021, the latter achieved the best efficiency so far: 29.8%.

In February 2026, the National Renewable Energy Laboratory (NREL) certified a new world record efficiency of 35.0% for a perovskite-silicon tandem solar cell, achieved by LONGi Green Energy. This surpassed the previous 2024–2025 records and moved the technology closer to commercial large-scale deployment.

== Stability ==
One big challenge for perovskite solar cells (PSCs) is the aspect of short-term and long-term stability. The traditional silicon-wafer solar cell in a power plant can last 20–25 years, setting that timeframe as the standard for solar cell stability. PSCs have great difficulty lasting that long. The instability of PSCs is mainly related to environmental influence (moisture and oxygen), thermal stress and intrinsic stability of methylammonium-based perovskite, and formamidinium-based perovskite, heating under applied voltage, photo influence (ultraviolet light) (visible light) and mechanical fragility. Several studies about PSCs stability have been performed and some elements have been proven to be important to the PSCs stability. However, there is no standard "operational" stability protocol for PSCs. But a method to quantify the intrinsic chemical stability of hybrid halide perovskites has been recently proposed.

The water-solubility of the organic constituent of the absorber material make devices highly prone to rapid degradation in moist environments. The degradation which is caused by moisture can be reduced by optimizing the constituent materials, the architecture of the cell, the interfaces and the environment conditions during the fabrication steps. Encapsulating the perovskite absorber with a composite of carbon nanotubes and an inert polymer matrix can prevent the immediate degradation of the material by moist air at elevated temperatures. However, no long-term studies and comprehensive encapsulation techniques have yet been demonstrated for perovskite solar cells. Devices with a mesoporous TiO_{2} layer sensitized with the perovskite absorber, are also UV-unstable, due to the interaction between photogenerated holes inside the TiO_{2} and oxygen radicals on the surface of TiO_{2}.

The measured ultra low thermal conductivity of 0.5 W/(Km) at room temperature in CH_{3}NH_{3}PbI_{3} can prevent fast propagation of the light deposited heat, and keep the cell resistive on thermal stresses that can reduce its life time. The PbI_{2} residue in perovskite film has been experimentally demonstrated to have a negative effect on the long-term stability of devices. The stabilization problem is claimed to be solved by replacing the organic transport layer with a metal oxide layer, allowing the cell to retain 90% capacity after 60 days. Besides, the two instabilities issues can be solved by using multifunctional fluorinated photopolymer coatings that confer luminescent and easy-cleaning features on the front side of the devices, while concurrently forming a strongly hydrophobic barrier toward environmental moisture on the back contact side. The front coating can prevent the UV light of the whole incident solar spectrum from negatively interacting with the PSC stack by converting it into visible light, and the back layer can prevent water from permeation within the solar cell stack. The resulting devices demonstrated excellent stability in terms of power conversion efficiencies during a 180-day aging test in the lab and a real outdoor condition test for more than 3 months.

In July 2015, major hurdles were that the largest perovskite solar cell was only the size of a fingernail and that they degraded quickly in moist environments. However, researchers from EPFL published in June 2017, a work successfully demonstrating large scale perovskite solar modules with no observed degradation over one year (short circuit conditions). Now, together with other organizations, the research team aims to develop a fully printable perovskite solar cell with 22% efficiency and with 90% of performance after ageing tests.

Early in 2019, the longest stability test reported to date showed a steady power output during at least 4000 h of continuous operation at Maximum power point tracking (MPPT) under 1 sun illumination from a xenon lamp based solar simulator without UV light filtering. Remarkably, the light harvester used during the stability test is classical methylammonium (MA) based perovskite, MAPbI_{3}, but devices are built up with neither organic based selective layer nor metal back contact. Under these conditions, only thermal stress was found to be the major factor contributing to the loss of operational stability in encapsulated devices.

The intrinsic fragility of the perovskite material requires extrinsic reinforcement to shield this crucial layer from mechanical stresses. Insertion of mechanically reinforcing scaffolds directly into the active layers of perovskite solar cells resulted in the compound solar cell formed exhibiting a 30-fold increase in fracture resistance, repositioning the fracture properties of perovskite solar cells into the same domain as conventional c-Si, CIGS and CdTe solar cells. Several approaches have been developed to improve perovskite solar cell stability. For instance, in 2021 researchers reported that the stability and long-term reliability of perovskite solar cells was improved with a new kind of "molecular glue".

As of 2021, the existing stability tests for solar panels and solar cell systems are designed solely for those containing silicon wafers. As such, these tests, produced by the International Electrotechnical Commission (IEC), have been re-evaluated for their lack of suitability. At the International Summit on Organic PV Stability (ISOS), stability checks for in-lab development of all solar cells were created, but these were not adopted by the IEC. These tests are not pass/fail criteria, rather they evaluate the various causes of solar cell stability issues to root out the problems. They are grouped into five categories: dark storage testing, outdoor testing, light soaking testing, thermal cycling testing, and light-humidity-thermal cycling testing. In these tests, the PCE and J-V data graphs of the PSCs were calculated among varying physical conditions to determine the various causes of PSC degradation.

Overall, these ISOS tests helped determine the causes of PSC degradation, which were found to include extended exposure to visible and UV light, environmental contamination, high temperatures, and electrical biases. After 200 temperature cycles, the 2020 PSCs still retained 90% of their power, indicating that they are capable of short-term stability. Now, what remains to be researched is long-term stability, and what material advances could be applied to boost these 200 temperature cycles (days) to 20–25 years.

In 2025, the Open Solar Stability (OSS) Lab introduced two tools specifically designed to address stability testing challenges in perovskite solar cells. The Perovskino, an open-source and low-cost maximum power point tracking (MPPT) device, was developed to accurately track performance degradation under operational conditions. Its galvanostatic approach proved particularly effective for devices exhibiting high hysteresis, a common issue in perovskite cells. The complete source code and documentation for the Perovskino are freely available on GitHub. Complementing this, the ParaSol platform, located in Zaragoza, Spain, enables long-term outdoor testing of multiple devices under real environmental conditions, while continuously tracking performance metrics, temperature, solar irradiance, and humidity. These tools represent an important advancement in standardizing stability measurements for perovskite photovoltaics by providing accessible methods for researchers to conduct comparable long-term stability studies.

=== Methods to improve performance and stability ===
Ion migration is a major issue with PSCs detrimental to their efficiency and long-term stability. Due to the soft ionic lattice of these materials, preventing the motion of halide ions (commonly I^{−}, Br^{−}, Cl^{−}) and metal cations (Pb^{2+}, Sn^{2+}) under elevated temperatures is paramount. This migration can reduce charge transport efficiency and generate internal electric fields that disrupt the operation of the solar cell. Maintaining phase segregation is critical in mixed-halid cell operation, thus this mechanism serves to disrupt stability by progressively degrading this phase separation. One effective strategy to reduce ion migration is to introduce Nd3+ cations as the higher valence state provides improved ability to impede halide migration and can passivate negatively charged defects at much lower concentration than traditional dopants such as Na^{+} at much lower concentrations (0.08% compared to 0.45%). Notably, researchers showed under 2002 hours of illumination that an encapsulated PSC device maintained 84.3% of its original power conversion efficiency (PCE), while a device doped with Na^{+} under the same conditions retained 72.7% of its PCE. However, this comes at a tradeoff, where the interstitial occupation introduces lattice strain which compromises long-range ordering and stability of the main phase.

The introduction of the Al_{2}O_{3}/NiO interfacial layer not only improves the crystalline quality of perovskite films with large grain size and enhances charge transport, but also effectively restricts the carrier recombination, but PSCs using this interface still have instability problem due to ion-migration and instability of perovskite crystals. To solve the problem, perovskite/Ag-rGO composites in active layer can be used to enhance the stability of PSCs and achieve high performance simultaneously. The Ag-rGO layer can act as a surface passivation layer, reducing defects and trap states at the perovskite layer's surface, which minimizes non-radiative recombination and improves performance and stability. In addition, the perovskite/Ag-rGO composite layer can act as a barrier, preventing moisture entering the perovskite layer and protecting it from degradation due to environmental effects. In the light harvesting measurements, perovskite/Ag-graphene PSCs show a higher Incident monochromatic photon-electron conversion efficiency (IPCE) value than traditional PSCs in the range of visible light. The current-voltage curve of the PSCs also shows the absence of hysteresis effect which is common in traditional PSCs. Perovskite/Ag-graphene PSCs also exhibit better thermal-stability aging at 90 degree Celsius and better photo-stability under continuous light illumination. To increase thermal stability, another low-cost additive in the form of caffeine has been proposed to elevate stable operating temperature. MBAPbI_{3} has been proven to be stable between 0-90C, which was improved to 196-242C after the addition of caffeine at 2-8% concentration. Caffeine forms a so-called "molecular lock" with Pb^{2+} ions which leads to a more stable crystalline structure that resists degradation at higher temperatures. By reducing the density of defects and grain boundaries, there are fewer sites for ion migration and mechanical degradation induced by thermal stress. However, the open-circuit voltage V_{oc} and fill factor (FF) decreases as a trade-off. To address the loss in V_{oc} and FF, SrTiO_{3}/TiO_{2} composite layer is chosen to overcome this low V_{oc} problem. By choosing SrTiO_{3}/TiO_{2} as light harvesting material, it is expected to achieve high stability as well as high V_{oc}.

== Hysteretic current-voltage behavior ==
Another major challenge for perovskite solar cells is the observation that current-voltage scans yield ambiguous efficiency values. The power conversion efficiency of a solar cell is usually determined by characterizing its current-voltage (IV) behavior under simulated solar illumination. In contrast to other solar cells, however, it has been observed that the IV-curves of perovskite solar cells show a hysteretic behavior: depending on scanning conditions – such as scan direction, scan speed, light soaking, biasing – there is a discrepancy between the scan from forward-bias to short-circuit (FB-SC) and the scan from short-circuit to forward bias (SC-FB). Various causes have been proposed such as ion movement, polarization, ferroelectric effects, filling of trap states, however, the exact origin for the hysteretic behavior is yet to be determined. But it appears that determining the solar cell efficiency from IV-curves risks producing inflated values if the scanning parameters exceed the time-scale which the perovskite system requires in order to reach an electronic steady-state. Two possible solutions have been proposed: Unger et al. show that extremely slow voltage-scans allow the system to settle into steady-state conditions at every measurement point which thus eliminates any discrepancy between the FB-SC and the SC-FB scan. The steady-state conditions with extremely slow voltage-scans can be simulated by drift-diffusion solvers SolarDesign and IonMonger.

Henry Snaith et al. have proposed 'stabilized power output' as a metric for the efficiency of a solar cell. This value is determined by holding the tested device at a constant voltage around the maximum power-point (where the product of voltage and photocurrent reaches its maximum value) and track the power-output until it reaches a constant value. Both methods have been demonstrated to yield lower efficiency values when compared to efficiencies determined by fast IV-scans. However, initial studies have been published that show that surface passivation of the perovskite absorber is an avenue with which efficiency values can be stabilized very close to fast-scan efficiencies. No obvious hysteresis of photocurrent was observed by changing the sweep rates or the direction in devices or the sweep rates. This indicates that the origin of hysteresis in photocurrent is more likely due to the trap formation in some non optimized films and device fabrication processes. The ultimate way to examine the efficiency of a solar cell device is to measure its power output at the load point. If there is large density of traps in the devices or photocurrent hysteresis for other reasons, the photocurrent would rise slowly upon turning on illumination This suggests that the interfaces might play a crucial role with regards to the hysteretic IV behavior since the major difference of the inverted architecture to the regular architectures is that an organic n-type contact is used instead of a metal oxide.

The ambiguity in determining the solar cell efficiency from current-voltage characteristics due to the observed hysteresis has also affected the certification process done by accredited laboratories such as NREL. The record efficiency of 20.1% for perovskite solar cells accepted as certified value by NREL in November 2014, has been classified as 'not stabilized'. To be able to compare results from different institution, it is necessary to agree on a reliable measurement protocol, as proposed by Zimmermann et al. with corresponding Matlab code on GitHub.

Beyond the ambiguity in determining efficiency, tracking perovskite solar cells with hysteresis at their maximum power point (MPP) presents an even greater challenge. The MPP voltage cannot be accurately determined from either the forward or reverse J-V scan due to the hysteresis effect, but rather it exists at higher voltages than either scan would suggest. Recent advancements have addressed this issue with an open-source galvanostatic tracker approach that can efficiently track cells with high hysteresis, rapidly finding the appropriate stabilized MPP voltage under constant illumination conditions. This method provides a more accurate means to evaluate the true operational performance of perovskite devices exhibiting significant hysteresis, helping to standardize stability testing protocols.

== Perovskites for tandem applications ==
A perovskite cell combined with a bottom cell such as Si or copper indium gallium selenide (CIGS) as a tandem design can suppress individual cell bottlenecks and take advantage of their complementary characteristics to enhance efficiency. These types of cells have higher efficiency potential, and therefore have attracted attention from academic researchers.

=== 4-terminal tandems ===
Using a four terminal configuration in which the two sub-cells are electrically isolated, Bailie et al. obtained a 17% to 18.6% efficient tandem cell with mc-Si (η ~ 11%) and copper indium gallium selenide (CIGS, η ~ 17%) bottom cells, respectively. A 13.4% efficient tandem cell with a highly efficient a-Si:H/c-Si heterojunction bottom cell using the same configuration has also been obtained. The application of TCO-based transparent electrodes to perovskite cells allowed fabricating near-infrared transparent devices with improved efficiency and lower parasitic absorption losses. The application of these cells in 4-terminal tandems allowed improved efficiencies up to 26.7% when using a silicon bottom cell and up to 23.9% with a CIGS bottom cell. In 2020, KAUST-University of Toronto teams reported 28.2% efficient four terminal perovskite/silicon tandem solar cells. To achieve these results, the team used Zr-doped In_{2}O_{3} transparent electrodes on semitransparent perovskite top cells, previously introduced by Aydin et al., which improved the near infrared response of the silicon bottom cells by utilizing broadband transparent H-doped In_{2}O_{3} electrodes. The team also enhanced the electron-diffusion length (up to 2.3 μm) thanks to Lewis base passivation via urea. The record efficiency for perovskite/silicon tandems currently stands at 28.2%.

=== 2-terminal tandems ===
Mailoa et al. started the efficiency race for monolithic 2-terminal tandems using an homojunction c-Si bottom cell, demonstrating a 13.7% efficiency cell, largely limited by parasitic absorption losses. Then, Albrecht et al. developed low-temperature processed perovskite cells using a SnO_{2} electron transport layer. This allowed the use of silicon heterojunction solar cells as bottom cells, with tandem cell efficiency up to 18.1%. Werner et al. then improved this performance by replacing the SnO_{2} layer with PCBM and introducing a sequential hybrid deposition method for the perovskite absorber, leading to a tandem cell with 21.2% efficiency. Important parasitic absorption losses due to the use of Spiro-OMeTAD were still limiting the overall performance. An important change was demonstrated by Bush et al., who inverted the polarity of the top cell (n-i-p to p-i-n). They used a bilayer of SnO_{2} and zinc tin oxide (ZTO) processed by ALD to work as a sputtering buffer layer, which deposited a transparent top of indium tin oxide (ITO) electrode. This change helped to improve the environmental and thermal stability of the perovskite cell and was crucial to further improve the perovskite/silicon tandem performance to 23.6%.

In the meantime, using a p-i-n perovskite top cell, Sahli et al. demonstrated in June 2018 a fully textured monolithic tandem cell with 25.2% efficiency, independently certified by Fraunhofer ISE CalLab. This improved efficiency can largely be attributed to the massively reduced reflection losses (below 2% in the range 360 nm-1000 nm, excluding metallization) and reduced parasitic absorption losses, leading to certified short-circuit currents of 19.5 mA/cm^{2}. Also in June 2018 the company Oxford Photovoltaics presented a cell with 27.3% efficiency. In March 2020, KAUST-University of Toronto teams reported in Science Magazine regarding tandem devices with spin-cast perovskite films on fully textured bottom cells with 25.7% efficiency. The research teams show effort to utilize more solution-based scalable techniques on textured bottom cells. Accordingly, blade-coated perovskite based tandems were reported by a collaborative team of University of North Carolina and Arizona State University. Following this, in August 2020 KAUST team demonstrated first slot-die coated perovskite based tandems, which was an important step for accelerated processing of tandems. In September 2020, Aydin et al. showed the highest certified short-circuit currents of 19.8 mA/cm^{2} on fully textured silicon bottom cells. Also, Aydin et al. showed the first outdoor performance results for perovskite/silicon tandem solar cells, which was an important hurdle for the reliability tests of such devices. In December 2021, KAUST team updated the champion certified PCE to 28.2%. The record efficiency for perovskite/silicon tandems currently stands at 29.8% as of December 2021. In 2025, record perovskite–silicon two-terminal tandems were reported, achieving a certified 34.58% power-conversion efficiency using an asymmetric self-assembled-monolayer hole-selective layer, and a certified 33.15% on industrially textured silicon via SiO_{x}-nanosphere iceberg-like pyramids with improved stability, highlighting progress toward industrial compatibility.

==== Simulation modeling ====
To investigate possible all-tandem perovskite candidates in an efficient and economical way, simulation software has been implemented. Shankar et al. published a paper in 2022 detailing their use of the Solar Cell Capacitance Simulator – One Dimensional software. This software allows the user to vary device parameters and properties to optimize performance. Results from this simulation research have exhibited efficiencies as high as 30% for a band gap of 1.4 eV, which resulted from increasing the external quantum efficiency to 95% via doping the transport layer. Shankar et al. simulated an efficiency of 32.3% by altering the material and thickness of the electron transport and hole transport layers. This simulated efficiency represents a 37% increase in simulated work so far and was obtained upon optimization of work done by Zhao et al. in two-terminal all-perovskite tandem solar cells.

=== Up-scaling ===
In May 2016, IMEC and its partner Solliance announced a tandem structure with a semi-transparent perovskite cell stacked on top of a back-contacted silicon cell. A combined power conversion efficiency of 20.2% was reported, with the potential claimed to exceed 30%.

=== All-perovskite tandems ===
In 2016, the development of efficient low-bandgap (1.2–1.3 eV) perovskite materials and the fabrication of efficient devices based on these enabled a new concept: all-perovskite tandem solar cells, where two perovskite compounds with different bandgaps are stacked on top of each other. The first two- and four-terminal devices with this architecture reported in the literature achieved efficiencies of 17% and 20.3% respectively. In addition, making formamidinium cesium lead iodide bromide perovskite into four-terminal tandem cells could achieve efficiency ranging from 19.8% to 25.2%, depending on the parameters of the measurements. All-perovskite tandem cells offer the prospect of being the first fully solution-processable architecture that has a clear route to exceeding not only the efficiencies of silicon, but also GaAs and other expensive III-V semiconductor solar cells.

In 2017, Dewei Zhao et al. fabricated low-bandgap (~1.25 eV) mixed Sn-Pb perovskite solar cells (PVSCs) with the thickness of 620 nm, which enables larger grains and higher crystallinity to extend the carrier lifetimes to more than 250 ns, reaching a maximum power conversion efficiency (PCE) of 17.6%. Furthermore, this low-bandgap PVSC reached an external quantum efficiency (EQE) of more than 70% in the wavelength range of 700–900 nm, the essential infrared spectral region where sunlight transmitted to bottom cell. They also combined the bottom cell with a ~1.58 eV bandgap perovskite top cell to create an all-perovskite tandem solar cell with four terminals, obtaining a steady-state PCE of 21.0%, suggesting the possibility of fabricating high-efficiency all-perovskite tandem solar cells.

A study in 2020 shows that all-perovskite tandems have much lower carbon footprints than silicon-perovskite tandems.

Additionally, in 2020, all-perovskite tandem efficiencies hit a new peak of 24.2% efficiency for 1 cm^{2} solar cells. This value was measured and recorded by Japan Electrical Safety and Environment Technology Laboratories, and was reached by passivating defects at grain boundaries of the traditional lead-tin perovskite using zwitterionic molecules. These inhibit tin ion oxidation, a process which lowers the efficiency of the solar cell by increasing trap density and preventing diffusion. The introduction of zwitterionic antioxidants greatly boosts the efficiency of these devices while only permitting an additional 2% degradation. The addition of zwitterionic substances also requires using an environment rich with formamidine sulfinic acid, catalyzing the necessary reactions to permit charge to transport between the solar cells.

In November 2022, the all-perovskite tandem efficiency reached a new record of 27.4%. This breaks the 2020 record for 1 cm^{2} solar cells, and was achieved by a joint team from Northwestern University, University of Toronto, and the University of Toledo. This cell additionally broke the previous record for Voc for all-perovskite tandems. This same cell was certified by NREL with a PCE of 26.3% and a Voc of 2.13V. This marks the "first certified all-perovskite tandem to surpass the record PCE (25.7%) of single-junction perovskite solar cells". A study by Chunqing Ma et al. (2020) identified areas for improvement in the Jsc values of perovskite solar cells, suggesting that optimizing these parameters could enable efficiencies exceeding 30%.

== Inverted perovskite solar cell ==
Inverted perovskite solar cells (PSCs) arrange the hole-transport layer beneath the perovskite absorber, in contrast to the conventional n–i–p layout. They gained traction after demonstrating reduced current–voltage hysteresis and potentially enhanced stability. Early research showed that tuning perovskite compositions and interfaces in the p–i–n architecture improved power conversion efficiencies above 26%. This arrangement also allows simpler low-temperature processing, which supports flexible devices. As laboratory results advance, inverted PSCs are considered strong candidates for large-scale solar applications and tandem architectures.

=== Fundamentals and working principle ===
In an inverted PSC, incident light first passes through a transparent electrode and hole-transport layer before reaching the perovskite absorber. Excitons split into electrons and holes, which then migrate in opposite directions due to built-in fields and favorable band alignment. Holes move downward toward the anode, while electrons drift upward through an electron-selective layer into the metal cathode. The reduced hysteresis often observed in p–i–n devices is partly linked to limited ion migration and fewer interfacial traps on the electron-collection side. By precisely controlling energy levels and interface quality, inverted PSCs can achieve high photovoltage and stable operation under continuous illumination.

=== Perovskite film engineering ===
Controlling the perovskite film is essential for achieving both high efficiency and reliability, starting with composition engineering where multiple cations (FA^{+}, MA^{+}, Cs^{+}) and halides (I^{−}, Br^{−}, Cl^{−}) are combined to optimize bandgap, phase stability, and crystallinity. Among these, blending formamidinium and cesium cations has proven effective at stabilizing the black-phase perovskite at room temperature, while partially substituting lead with tin offers a path to reduce toxicity and tune the bandgap, albeit with additional doping and oxidation challenges. Additive engineering, involving molecules such as small amines, polymers, and inorganic salts, can passivate grain boundaries and suppress deep-level traps, improving both open-circuit voltage and operational lifetime. Another important strategy involves controlling solvent chemistry – binary or ternary solvents (DMF, DMSO, NMP) or ionic-liquid-based systems – to form intermediate phases that yield dense, pinhole-free films upon annealing. Intermediate adducts, in particular, promote a more controlled crystal growth that reduces defects. Researchers also utilize techniques like anti-solvent dripping, gas-quenching, and vacuum-assisted drying to tailor crystal nucleation and achieve uniform, large grains with fewer grain boundaries. Alongside compositional and solvent control, the thermal annealing profile, sometimes split into stepwise temperature ramps, can transform meta stable intermediate states into the desired perovskite phase with improved reproducibility. Because the film composition strongly affects moisture tolerance, many labs explore partial or complete removal of volatile MA+ cations to reduce the film's sensitivity to humidity or temperature, demonstrating stable operation over hundreds of hours.

=== Charge transport layers ===
An inverted perovskite cell typically employs a hole transport layer (HTL) at the bottom and an electron transport layer (ETL) at the top, each selected to align energy levels favorably with the perovskite absorber. On the hole transport side, many devices started with PEDOT:PSS, but its acidity and suboptimal energy alignment often limit voltage and stability, prompting the adoption of alternatives like NiOx, whose wide bandgap and good thermal tolerance are advantageous. Additional doping in NiOx (for instance, Li-doping) can raise conductivity and yield higher fill factors. Organic HTLs such as PTAA or poly-TPD also appear frequently due to their solution processability and amenable energy levels, though their wetting properties need to be carefully adjusted to ensure smooth perovskite deposition. Organic hole-transport materials have also expanded rapidly in recent years, with a wide range of polymeric and small-molecule HTLs being synthesized and demonstrated in perovskite solar cells to improve energy-level alignment, conductivity, processability, and operational stability. On the electron transport side, fullerene derivatives like C60 or PCBM remain the mainstream choice, known for their low trap density, excellent coverage, and strong electron affinity. These fullerene layers may be combined with a thin buffer layer, such as BCP or LiF, to block holes and protect against metal electrode diffusion. Some device designs incorporate bilayers of fullerene with metal oxide nanoparticles (SnO_{2} or ZnO) to enhance device stability, especially under harsh environmental conditions. Recent advances involve self-assembled monolayers or 2D material coatings that enable extremely thin yet robust interfaces, sometimes contributing to record voltage outputs. The synergy between the transport layer composition, doping strategy, and the overall device architecture can dramatically affect the PCE, making CTL optimization a critical research direction.

=== Interface engineering ===
Maximizing performance and stability requires careful tuning of both the top and bottom interfaces, where lattice mismatch, energy misalignment, and high defect densities frequently arise. For the bottom interface (HTL/perovskite), selecting a surface with proper wettability ensures uniform nucleation of the perovskite, which can otherwise form cracks or voids. Many labs introduce self-assembled or crosslinked molecules that bond strongly to the inorganic sublayer and simultaneously passivate grain boundaries. Alternatively, depositing ultrathin 2D or quasi-2D perovskite layers at the bottom can smooth out surface roughness and serve as a passivation barrier, thus improving open-circuit voltage. The top interface (perovskite/ETL), on the other hand, often suffers from halide vacancies or lead-rich regions that become centers for nonradiative recombination. Incorporating buckyball derivatives or halogen-containing passivation agents can mitigate such losses, while also ensuring that no direct contact occurs between metal electrodes and the absorber. Another pressing issue is controlling band bending in these interfacial regions: properly tuning doping or adding dipole layers can shift the local vacuum level to boost the cell's built-in electric field. Molecular dopants or metal chelates introduced in the perovskite or at the interface also reduce charge-transport barriers, facilitate extraction, and potentially block ion migration. Hybrid approaches, integrating organic passivation layers with inorganic overlayers, show promise in tackling multiple challenges at once, especially under continuous illumination or elevated temperatures.

=== Stability and degradation ===
Despite enormous gains in efficiency, long-term stability remains a central topic, particularly for commercial viability, as perovskite films can degrade under moisture, oxygen, heat, and UV illumination. In inverted PSCs, the architecture can be more resilient to certain failure modes, for instance, by placing the metal electrode on top, thus reducing direct contact with halides. However, thermal stress and ionic motion within the perovskite can still lead to decomposition pathways if the film composition or interface design is inadequate. Substituting MA+ with more stable cations, such as FA+ or cesium, is a popular route to enhance thermal robustness, while interfacial modifications, such as the addition of self-assembled monolayers or alkylammonium-based capping layers, help protect against moisture. Some groups confirm that the inverted structure can pass stringent reliability tests including damp heat (85 °C/85% RH) and continuous illumination for over 1,000 hours without severe degradation. Another factor is that metal electrode materials, like silver or copper, may diffuse or react under operating conditions, prompting the use of inorganic buffer layers or barrier coatings. Adopting carbon-based electrodes or tin oxides can also help minimize corrosion or doping issues. Overall, the synergy between stable compositions, robust transport layers, and carefully passivated interfaces has led to inverted PSCs that promise to sustain output with minimal performance drop over thousands of hours.

== Commercialization ==
A factory producing perovskite solar cells was opened in May 2021 in Wrocław by Saule Technologies. As of 2021 there was a little manufacturing in Poland and China, but large-scale deployment was held back by the instability and shorter lifespan of the cells. Oxford PV opened a factory in Brandenburg, Germany in 2022.

However companies hope to have perovskite-on-silicon tandem products on the market with a 25-year warranty sometime in the mid-2020s. They may help to meet the high targets for new solar power in India. Building integrated photovoltaics is a possible area of commercialisation, and while there are still stability-related concerns, in 2021 a building in Lublin became the first to be clad with perovskite solar panels, which marked the first commercial use of perovskite.

The U.S. Department of Energy Solar Energy Technologies Office (SETO) is a government organization that is investing in the research and development of perovskite solar technologies. They have identified several key areas of improvement if perovskite solar cells are to play a part in the future of photovoltaic technologies.

The four target areas for improvement are stability and durability, power conversion efficiency at scale, manufacturability, and technology validation and bankability. The first and third points are addressed above in the Processing and Scalability sections.

Power conversion efficiency at scale remains a problem because laboratory efficiencies for small-area devices have not been proven at larger scale devices. Current small-scale devices may find use in mobile and disaster response technologies due to their light weight, flexibility, and power-to-weight ratios, but large-scale testing will be necessary before the power industry adopts this technology on the grid-level.

The technology validation and bankability area of development points to the willingness of financial institutions to collaborate with these technologies. This will require a standardization of testing protocols and an increase in field data available. The degradation of perovskite solar cells makes current PV testing methods unrealistic in predicting performance in real-world applications. To address these concerns in the adoption of perovskite technology, SETO has funded the Perovskite Photovoltaic Accelerator for Commercializing Technologies (PACT) Validation and Bankability Center. PACT will set standardized field and lab testing and conduct bankability studies to ensure that perovskite technology is ready for commercialization. SETO also published performance targets to direct research and verify that projects are relevant to the development of commercialization. In October 2024, PACT expanded and revised its mission to include 'all PV module technologies'.

According to the American Ceramic Society, in September 2024, tandem 72-cell panels for a utility-scale installation were shipped to the United States by Oxford Photovoltaics, based in the U.K. Oxford PV plans to increase production of the modules—which have 24.5% efficiency—to gigawatt scale in the future.

== See also ==
- Dye-sensitized solar cell
- Emerging photovoltaics
- Hybrid solar cell
- List of types of solar cells
- Methylammonium lead halide
- Nanocrystal solar cell
- Perovskite (mineral)
- Polymer solar cell
- Thin film solar cell
- Third generation photovoltaic cell
