= ENI award =

Prize to encourage better use of energy sources

The Eni Award
- Awarded for: Outstanding contributions in field of The New Frontiers in Hydrocarbons (Hydrocarbon award), The Renewable and Non-Conventional Energy (Renewable energy award), The Protection of the Environment (Environment award).
- Presented by: Eni S.p.A., largest Italian industrial company with a market capitalization of €40 billion, as of 31 December 2024.
- Committee: Eni Scientific committee. This committee includes Nobel prize winners and luminous personalities from Stanford University, MIT, Cambridge, University of Stuttgart, Florida State University, Università di Pisa - Pisa, Università del Texas - Austin, etc.

The Eni Award is a prize awarded by the Italian oil and gas company Eni with the aim of encouraging better use of energy sources and increased environmental research. The strict award guidelines and the notable names on the selection committee (including Nobel laureates) make Eni a coveted award. List of Eni award winners include Nobel laureates like Harry Kroto and Alan J. Heeger.

Some websites and magazines (Fondazione Eni Enrico Mattei) have called the Eni award the "Nobel prize of energy research". The scientific committee of the Eni award includes representatives from Stanford University, MIT, Cambridge, University of Stuttgart, Florida State University, University of Pisa, University of Texas at Austin, and others. The annual Eni award was launched in July 2007, foreseen by the group's Technological Master Plan. The Eni award extends and replaces the Eni-Italgas Prize, previously known as the Italgas Prize, which in 2006 had reached its XIX edition.

== Award selection ==
The award's Scientific Committee – which has the role of evaluating the candidates and assigning the prizes, is of the highest level and comprises researchers and scientists from some of the world's most advanced research institutes, and includes Jean-Marie Lehn, Nobel Prize 1987 for Chemistry.

In subsequent years, 78 researchers from 20 countries have been awarded: Italy, Germany, the United States, Australia, France, Canada, Spain, Norway, the Netherlands, Switzerland, the United Kingdom, Israel, Sweden, South Korea, India, Egypt, South Africa, the Republic of the Congo, Nigeria, and Ethiopia. Included in the number are six Nobel Prize laureates. More than 7,559 researchers from around the world have submitted their research projects, to which should be added the numerous personalities who have guaranteed or been a part of the various evaluation commissions.

The distinguished representatives of the international scientific community who have received the Eni award in the past include Harry Kroto, 1996 Nobel Prize for Chemistry; Alan J. Heeger, 2000 Nobel Prize for Chemistry (unlike the others, he had won the Nobel Prize before receiving this award); Theodor W. Hänsch, 2005 Nobel Prize for Physics; Frances Arnold, 2018 Nobel Prize for Chemistry; Giorgio Parisi and Klaus Hasselmann, 2021 Nobel Prize for Physics; and Omar M. Yaghi, 2025 Nobel Prize for Chemistry.

== 1987–2006 recipients ==
- 1987
  - Physics – Theodor W. Hänsch
  - Energy Sciences – Mario Silvestri
  - Computer Science – Angelo Raffaele Meo
- 1988
  - Chemistry – Peter Gray
  - Environmental Sciences – Sergio Rinaldi
  - Technology and Science of Materials – Bernard Raveau
- 1989
  - Physics – Gilberto Bernardini
  - Environmental Sciences – Ramon Margalef
  - Communications – Francesco Carassa
- 1990
  - Chemistry – Fernando Montanari
  - Environmental Sciences – Peter Wadhams
  - Technology and Science of Materials – Jacques Friedel
- 1991
  - Physics – Emilio Picasso
  - Energy Sciences – Felix Weinberg
  - Computer Science – Maurice Wilkes
- 1992
  - Chemistry – Harry Kroto
  - Environmental Sciences – Bruno Battaglia
  - Communications – Mario Pent
- 1993
  - Physics – Giorgio Parisi
  - Energy Sciences – Bruno Coppi
  - Technology and Sciences of Materials – Manuel Cardona
- 1994
  - Chemistry – Vincenzo Balzani
  - Environmental Sciences – Claude Lorius
  - Computer Science – Robin Milner
- 1995
  - Physics – Olli Lounasmaa
  - Energy Sciences – Maurizio Cumo
  - Communications – Fabio Rocca
- 1996
  - Chemistry – Carmelo Giacovazzo
  - Environmental Science – Klaus Hasselmann
  - Technology and Science of Materials – Franco Bassani, Giuseppe Zerbi
- 1997
  - Science and Technology for Energy, Information Systems and the Environment – Jean Laurent Mallet, Andrew Williams Woods
- 1998
  - Science and Technology for the Information – Sergio Benedetto, Pierluigi Poggiolini
  - Science and Technology for the Energy – Franz Durst, Dimosthenis Trimis
- 1999
  - Science and Technology for Information Systems – Teuvo Kohonen
  - Science and Technology for Energy – Peter Geoffrey Gray, Michael Petch
- 2000
  - Science and Technology for the Environment – Gus Hancock, Andreas Hofzumahaus
  - Science and Technology for Information Systems – Orazio Svelto
- 2001
  - Applied Molecular Sciences – Graham Richards, Richard Friend, Jean-Luc Brédas
- 2003
  - Science and Environment – Michael Grätzel, Bruno Scrosati
  - Projects for the Environment – Barefoot College
  - Debut in the World of Research – Francesco Donsi, Alessandro Zavatta
- 2004
  - Science and Environment – Daniel G. Nocera
  - Projects for the Environment – West Bengal Renewable Energy Development Agency
  - Debut in the World of Research – Debora Fino, Valentina Bosetti
- 2005
  - Science and Environment – James Barber
  - Projects for the Environment – Nepal Trust Organisation
  - Debut in Research – Pietro Asinari, Sara Biamino, Erik Vesselli
- 2006
  - Science and Environment – Paul Alivisatos, Alan J. Heeger
  - Debut in Research – Alberto Gasparotto, Maria Assunta Navarra
  - Popularization of Science – Vittorio Bo
  - Special Prize – TuttoScienze, Piero Bianucci

== 2008 recipients ==
Prizes awarded in 2008 include:

- The Research and Environment prize was awarded to the American scientist J. Craig Venter, one of the most important living geneticists who, in 2000, announced that he was the first to have complete a map of the human genome. The prize was awarded for late 2007 research paper, published in the journal Science, in which he created a synthetic chromosome in the laboratory while working on the DNA of bacteria. Venter's results are a fundamental step towards synthetic genes, which promise an unlimited range of revolutionary applications in the energy and environmental fields, such as new processes for the sequestration of CO_{2} or the regeneration of polluted environments. In terms of energy, this research opens the road to the design of new metabolic paths for the production of innovative biofuels from organic materials.
- The Science and Technology prize was awarded ex aequo to Arthur J. Nozik (U.S. Department of Energy's National Renewable Laboratory in Golden, Colorado) and Stefan W. Glunz (Fraunhofer Institute for Solar Energy Systems ISE in Freiburg, Germany), both active in the field of the conversion of solar energy using photovoltaic technology.
- The two Research Debut prizes have been awarded to the young researchers Silvia Cereda (Università di Milano Bicocca) and Gian Luca Chiarello (Università degli Studi di Milano) for research that promises interesting developments in the field of energy production.

== 2009 recipients ==
Prizes awarded in 2009 include

- The New Frontiers in Hydrocarbons award was assigned ex aequo to Alan G. Marshall (USA, National High Magnetic Field Laboratory) and Tony Settari (Canada), an expert in reservoir engineering and computerized simulations of oil reservoirs, as well as in geochemical processes and basin fracture analysis. It is awarded for research into the exploration, advanced recovery, development, refinement, transportation and distribution of oil and natural gas.
- The Renewable and Non-Conventional Energy award was given to Martin Green. It is presented for advanced R&D results in renewable and non-conventional energy sources.
- The Protection of the Environment award was awarded to Gérard Férey. It is presented for outstanding research and innovation in areas concerning the environmental impact of human activities, specifically protection and restoration of the environment, with a special focus on research and innovative technologies to eliminate local pollutants and CO_{2} to improve environmental conditions.
- The two Research Debut awards, given to young scholars to promote research in Italy, have been assigned to Alberto Cuoci and Loredana De Rogatis. They cover the same areas as the three international awards: research and technological innovation in hydrocarbons, renewable and non-conventional energy, and protection and restoration of the environment.

== 2010 recipients ==
Prizes awarded in 2010 include:

- The New Frontiers of Hydrocarbons prize was assigned ex aequo to Avelino Corma, Instituto de Tecnología Química UPV-CSIC (Valencia), for his important discoveries about the synthesis of new catalysts to improve the refinement of the heaviest oil fractions and to Mark Knackstedt, Australian National University (Canberra), for his pioneering research into the location and characteristics of oil-fields, grounded on high resolution and 3D images of rock structures.
- The Renewable and Non-Conventional Energy prize was assigned to Angela Belcher, MIT (Boston), for her innovative and fundamental research project on the principles of development of the natural systems that can reconvert and use energy.
- The Protection of the Environment prize was awarded to François Morel, Princeton University, for his important discovery of a new class of enzymes that plays a crucial role in CO_{2} transport and fixation.
- The Debut in Research prizes were awarded to Lorenzo Fagiano, Polytechnic University of Turin (Turin), for a dissertation that represents an important ad innovative contribution on high altitude wind power generation and that includes theoretical analyses, systems planning, simulations and economic analyses; and to Matteo Mauro (University of Milan, Department of Inorganic Chemistry “L. Malatesta”) for a research project on high-efficiency energy devices with a strong potential for application to light-emitting systems with low energy loss, based on innovative electroluminescent components.

== 2011 recipients ==
Prizes awarded in 2011 include:

- The New Frontiers of Hydrocarbons prize was shared ex aequo between two outstanding scientists, Professor Gabor A. Somorjai from University of California and Professor Martin Landrø from Norwegian University of Science and Technology. Professor Somorjai won the prize for his excellent work on the cracking process, while professor Landrø was awarded for his advanced "4D" seismic analysis technique. This was the last year, for the Eni Award, of a single New Frontiers of Hydrocarbons Prize: the following 2012 Edition presented two different Prizes, aimed to the Downstream and Upstream sectors.
- The Renewable and Non-Conventional Energy prize was given to Professor Gregory Stephanopoulos from Massachusetts Institute of Technology, for his research on the bacterial genetic structure, with the aim of converting raw materials into hydrocarbons.
- The Protection of the Environment prize was assigned to Professor Jean-Marie Tarascon from the University of Picardie "Jules Verne", for his outstanding research in the lithium-ion battery sector, aimed to produce safer batteries with lower costs and environmental impact.
- The two Debut in Research prizes were awarded to Dr. Simone Gamba from the Politecnico di Milano, for his PhD Thesis on the hydrocracking process, and to Dr. Fabrizio Frontalini from the University of Urbino "Carlo Bo", for his PhD Thesis concerning the use of benthic foraminifera as biomarkers for the monitoring of pollution.

== 2012 recipients ==
Prizes awarded in 2012 include:

- The New Frontiers of Hydrocarbons prize (Upstream) was awarded to Fabio Rocca, professor emeritus of Telecommunications at the Politecnico of Milan, and Alessandro Ferretti, CEO of "Tele-Rilevamento Europa" (TRE) for developing an algorithm to process data from satellite observation systems.
- The New Frontiers of Hydrocarbons prize (Downstream) was awarded to Enrique Iglesia, Professor of Chemical Engineering at the University of California, Berkeley, for developing a more effective catalyst that is able to efficiently transform raw materials.
- The Renewable, non-conventional energy prize was awarded to Harry A. Atwater, Professor of Applied Physics and Materials Science at the California Institute of Technology and director of the Resnick Institute for Science, Energy and Sustainability, and Albert Polman, Director and Scientific Group Leader of the FOM Institute AMOLF in Amsterdam, for their research to optimize the production of solar energy by reducing costs.
- The Environmental protection prize was awarded to Barbara Sherwood Lollar, Professor of Geology at the University of Toronto, for the application of stable isotope geochemistry for the research and protection of groundwater resources.
- The two Research Debut awards were conferred to Silvia Comba, for her work on iron as a solution to the problem of the pollution of aquifers, and Jijeesh Ravi Nair, for his work on electricity storage from renewable sources through the improvement of lithium batteries. Both of them are from the Politecnico of Turin.

== 2013 recipients ==
Prizes awarded in 2013 include:

- The New Frontiers of Hydrocarbons prize (Downstream) was awarded to Rajamani Krishna, a professor at Amsterdam University's Van’t Hoff Institute for Molecular Sciences for his research to improve the processes of gas-purification and separation.
- The New Frontiers of Hydrocarbons prize (Upstream) was awarded to Philip G. Jessop, professor of Inorganic Chemistry and Canada Research Chair in Green Chemistry in the Chemistry Department at Queen's University at Kingston (Ontario), who discovered a way to engineer on-demand intelligent solvents’ properties, using chemical compounds as switch.
- The Renewable and Non-conventional Energy award has been shared ex aequo by Frances Arnold, Professor of Chemical Engineering, Biochemistry and Bioengineering at the California Institute of Technology for the creation of methods aimed to bio catalysts engineering for high selectivity production of fuels and chemicals from biomass, and James C. Liao, Parson Foundation Professor and head of the Chemical and Biomolecular Engineering Department at the University of California for the selection of microorganisms for converting wood cellulose biomass, waste proteins and carbon dioxide into useful chemical compounds and fuels.
- The Environmental protection prize was awarded to Roberto Danovaro, professor of Biology and Marine Ecology at the Polytechnic University of the Marches for his research investigating the role played by viruses in maintaining the balance of the marine ecosystem and controlling the capacity to absorb CO_{2}.
- The two Research Debut awards were conferred to Matteo Cargnello, a graduate of Trieste University for his research focusing on the synthesis of precise nanostructures that provide active and stable catalysts for energy production, and to Damiano Genovese, a post-doc researcher with the Photochemical Nanosciences Group at Bologna University for his analysis of the supra-molecular approach for the creation of fluorescent nano-structures to be applied in various sectors.

== 2014 recipients ==
Prizes awarded in 2014 include:

- The New Frontiers of Hydrocarbons prize (Downstream) was awarded to Amir H. Hoveyda, Boston College (Massachusetts-USA), for developing catalysts for synthesizing complex molecules with specific properties.
- The New Frontiers of Hydrocarbons prize (Upstream) was awarded to Tapan Mukerji, Gary Mavko and Jack Dvorkin, Stanford University, and to Dario Grana, University of Wyoming, for developing a method to get quantitative information from the subsurface from seismic data.
- The Renewable Energy prize has been awarded to Jay D. Keasling, University of California, Berkeley, (USA), for his research aimed at engineering microorganisms, in particular Escherichia coli and Saccharomyces cerevisiae.
- The Environmental protection prize was awarded to Clément Sanchez, Collège de France in Paris, for developing highly innovative technologies for the design, synthesis and processing of multi functional inorganic and hybrid organic-inorganic materials
- The two Research Debut awards were conferred to Martina Siena for a numerical simulation of fluid flow in oil and gas deposits and to Nicola Bortolamei for his excellent thesis on the electro-chemical methods for the production of special polymeric materials.

== 2015 recipients ==
Prizes awarded in 2015 include:

- The New Frontiers of Hydrocarbons prize (Downstream) was awarded to Helmut Schwarz of the Technische Universität Berlin for his research about the activation of methane for its conversion into heavier or oxygenated hydrocarbons.
- The New Frontiers of Hydrocarbons prize (Upstream) was awarded to Johan Olof Anders Robertsson, of the ETH in Zurich for his research on the development of a technology for the acquisition and modelling of sea prospecting data using seismic methods.
- The Renewable Energy prize award has been conferred to Mercouri Kanatzidis, from Northwestern University in Evanston, Illinois, for his research about the development of new solid state semiconductors able to recover waste heat and convert it directly into electricity.
- The Environmental protection prize was awarded to Menachem Elimelech, Professor at Yale University, for the development of the "Forward Osmosis" process for the desalination of high salinity water.
- The two Research Debut awards were conferred to Daniela Meroni for her research about the applicability of titanium dioxide (TiO_{2}) in the environmental reclamation processes, and to Margherita Maiuri for her studies about the mechanisms that govern the collection of solar radiation via the spectroscopic observation of ultrashort optical pulses.

== 2016 recipients ==
Prizes awarded in 2016 include:

- The New Frontiers of Hydrocarbons prize (Downstream) was awarded to Johannes Lercher, from the Technical University of Munich for his research about new catalytic strategies for the synthesis of alkenes and alkanols.
- The New Frontiers of Hydrocarbons prize (Upstream) was awarded ex aequo to Christopher Ballentine from University of Oxford for his studies on underground fluid systems, and to Emiliano Mutti from the University of Parma for his research on Deep-Water sedimentation.
- The Environmental protection prize was awarded to David Milstein, from the Weizmann Institute of Science for his research on catalytic reactions to replace polluting processes.
- The two Research Debut awards were conferred to Federico Bella from the Polytechnic University of Turin for his research on third-generation solar cells made predominantly of plastic materials and to Alessandra Menafoglio from the Polytechnic University of Milan for her studies of wide-ranging and complex data to make reliable predictions about natural variables.

== 2017 recipients ==
Prizes awarded in 2017 include:

- The Energy Transition prize was awarded to Robert Schlögl for his research in the field of hydrogen and methane production from renewable sources.
- The Advanced Environmental Solutions prize was awarded to Graham Hutchings for the development of low environmental impact catalysts.
- The Energy Frontiers prize has been awarded to Jens Nielsen for his research on the engineering of microorganisms.
- The Young Researcher of the Year prizes were awarded to Matteo Fasano for his studies into the synthesis of nano-materials and to Stefano Langé for the development of an innovative process for high CO_{2} and H_{2}S content natural gas purification.
- The Young Talents from Africa prizes were awarded to Blessing Onyeche Ugwoke (Nigeria), for a study on the energy efficiency off-grid renewable energy systems in Nigeria, and to Yemane Kelemework Equbamariam for his thesis on integrated geophysical investigations of the Main Ethiopian Rift applied to the exploration of geothermal resources.

== 2018 recipients ==
Prizes awarded in 2018 include:

- The Energy Transition prize was awarded to Omar M. Yaghi from the University of California, Berkeley, for his research in the field of crystalline-porous solids.
- The Advanced Environmental Solutions prize was awarded to Sang Yup Lee from the Korea Advanced Institute of Science and Technology of Daejeon in South Korea for developing engineered bacteria to produce chemical products, fuels and non-food biomass materials.
- The Energy Frontiers prize has been awarded to Zhong Lin Wang from the Georgia Institute of Technology, Atlanta, for his "triboelectric nanogenerators", a new group of devices capable of converting naturally occurring energy into high-yielding electricity.
- The Young Researcher of the Year prizes were awarded to Michele De Bastiani for his thesis on the stability of two emerging photovoltaic technologies: organic photovoltaic and perovskite-based cells, and to Gianluca Longoni for his thesis on the development of innovative electrodes for sodium ion based batteries.
- The Young Talents from Africa prizes were awarded to Emerance Jessica Claire D'Assise Goma-Tchimbakala of the Marien NGouabi University of Brazzaville (Congo) for her studies on the effect of microorganisms and metabolized synthesized substances on environmental rehabilitation and to Elvis Tinashe Ganda, a Zimbabwean student at Durban University of Technology (South Africa) for his studies on biomass, a renewable alternative fuel.

== 2019 recipients ==
Prizes awarded in 2019 include:

- The Energy Transition prize was awarded to James A. Dumesic, of the University of Wisconsin-Madison, for developing catalytic processes for converting biomass fuels and chemical products.
- The Advanced Environmental Solutions prize was awarded to Paul Chirik, of Princeton University, for his research in the field of catalysis.
- The Energy Frontiers prize has been awarded to Michael Aziz and Roy Gordon, of Harvard University, who have developed a new kind of cheaper and innovative battery.
- The Young Researcher of the Year prizes were awarded to Alberto Pizzolato for his research on modelling methods for 3D printing, and to Matteo Monai for his research for developing nanostructured catalysts based on non-noble metal alloys.
- The Young Talents from Africa prizes were awarded to Emmanuel Kweinor Tetteh of the Durban University of Technology for developing a process that combines innovative photocatalysts with biological treatment systems for waste water, simultaneously converting CO_{2} into fuel, and to Madina Mahmoud of the American University in Cairo, for her research on preparing innovative membranes to treat water from production.

== 2020 recipients ==
Prizes awarded in 2020 include:

- The Energy Transition prize was awarded to David T. Allen of the University of Texas for his researches on the highly topical issue of fugitive methane emissions.
- The Advanced Environmental Solutions prize was awarded to Jürgen Caro and Jörg Kärger, from the Universities of Hanover and Leipzig respectively, for their work leading to the development of micro-imaging techniques for the observation of diffusive molecule flows in nanoporous materials.
- The Energy Frontiers prize has been awarded to Chintamani Nagesa Ramachandra Rao, of the International Centre for Materials Science in Bangalore, for his work on metal oxides, carbon nanotubes and other materials.
- The Young Researcher of the Year prizes were awarded to Matteo Morciano, who has developed innovative technologies for passive drinking water production using solar energy, and Francesca De Falco, for her research about microplastic pollution.
- The Young Talents from Africa prizes were awarded to Alaa Abbas and Mohamed Ahmed Ismail Tarek, The American University in Cairo, Egypt and Djalila Ben Bouchta, Cairo University, Egypt. Abbas' proposal relates to the improvement of wastewater treatment and energy production; Tarek will develop a computational model to improve e-waste management; Ben Bouchta proposes a multi-disciplinary approach to the provision of energy services to enable the productive use of energy for female entrepreneurs in sub-Saharan Africa.

== 2022 recipients ==
Prize was not awarded in 2021. Prizes awarded in 2022 include:

- The Energy Transition prize was awarded to Naomi Halas and Peter Nordlander of Rice University (Houston, Texas), for their work on the generation and sustainable distribution of hydrogen.
- The Advanced Environmental Solutions prize was awarded to Geoffrey W. Coates, from Cornell University (New York, United States) for his research related to the development of new macromolecules to solve the problems of plastic pollution.
- The Energy Frontiers prize has been awarded to Jens Nørskov and Ib Chorkendorff, from the Technical University of Denmark, for their work on the sustainable production of fuels and chemicals.
- The Young Researcher of the Year prizes were awarded to Isabella Fiorello, who has developed mini-robots applicable to precision agriculture, and Giulia Fredi, who carried out research in the thermal energy storage sector.
- The Young Talents from Africa prizes were awarded to Yousif Adam from the American University in Cairo (Egypt), Ibrahim Mohamed Ibrahim Moustafa Ibrahim from the Arab Academy for Science, Technology and Maritime Transport (Egypt), Andsera Adugna Mekonen from Addis Ababa University (Ethiopia) and Andris Metumo Simeon from the University of Cape Town (South Africa). Adam's proposal concerns the sustainable management of wastewater in Africa, based on the use of micro-algae. Ibrahim has developed an advanced predictive approach for estimating energy generation from solar installations. Mekonen has carried out a study of the sustainable agroforestry ecosystem. Finally, Simeon has developed a study on intelligent protection strategies for hybrid micro-grids.

== 2023 recipients ==
Prizes awarded in 2023 include:

- The Energy Transition prize was awarded to Yu Huang of University of California (Los Angeles, USA) for research about sustainable Hydrogen Fuel Cells, and to Jeffrey R. Long of University of California (Berkeley, USA) for his study of cooperative gas capture in metal–organic framework materials.
- The Advanced Environmental Solutions prize was awarded to Thalappil Pradeep, from Indian Institute of Technology, Madras (India), for his research related to the production of clean water using advanced materials.
- The Energy Frontiers prize has been awarded to Matthew Rosseinsky, from the University of Liverpool (UK), for his study of digital design and discovery of next-generation energy materials.
- The Young Researcher of the Year prizes were awarded to Michele Ghini, who researched metal oxide nanocrystals for light-driven energy storage, and Hilmar del Carmen Guzmán Medina, who studied electrocatalytic reduction of CO_{2} to value-added products.
- The Young Talents from Africa prizes were awarded to Gloria Amo-Duodu from the Durban University of Technology (South Africa), Elshaday Mulu Fetene from Moi University (Kenya), Tsion Ayalew Kebede from Addis Ababa University (Ethiopia) and Natnael Tilahun Sinshaw from the Addis Ababa Science and Technology University (Ethiopia). Gloria studied the application of synthesized magnetic nanoparticles for biogas production using anaerobic digestion. Elshaday researched biogas upgrades using natural and modified adsorbents. Tsion's study was an evaluation of spectral built-up indices for impervious surface extraction by using sentinel-2a MSI imageries. Natnael created a developing Potato's Leaves disease detection model using Convolutional neural network.

== 2024 recipients ==
Prizes awarded in 2024 include:

- The Energy Transition prize was awarded to Marc Fontecave of College de France (Paris, France) for research about the development of catalytic and electrocatalytic systems to improve the processes of conversion of carbon dioxide and carbon monoxide to products of high interest.
- The Advanced Environmental Solutions prize was awarded to Holger Braunschweig, from Julius-Maximilians-Universität Würzburg, Würzburg (Germany), for his development of new catalysts to produce nitrogen compounds more sustainably and with less environmental impact.
- The Energy Frontiers prize has been awarded to Nam-Gyu Park, from the Sungkyunkwan University (South Korea), for his research in the field of perovskites, innovative materials used in third-generation photovoltaics.
- The Young Researcher of the Year prizes were awarded to Elvira Spatolisano, who researched two innovative technologies for the valorisation of hydrogen sulfide, and Stefano Toso, who studied an emerging class of semiconductor materials.
- The Young Talents from Africa prizes were awarded to Favour Agbajor from the Durban University of Technology (South Africa), Petra Kienyiy Chui from Egerton University (Kenya), Lakhdar Hamidatou from Ecole Nationale Polytechnique de Constantine (Algeria) and Nomthandazo Precious Sibiya from the Durban University of Technology (South Africa). Agbajor studied a novel systems configuration that optimizes building energy efficiency. Chui will investigate the viability of fuel production from plastic waste and its implications for the circular economy in Cameroon. Hamidatou's research aims to implement a cooling kit for photovoltaic panels. Sibiya research focused on the use of agricultural waste as adsorbents for heavy metal removal from wastewaters.

== 2025 recipients ==
Prizes awarded in 2025 include:

- The Energy Transition prize was awarded to Jeff Dahn of Dalhousie University (Canada) for researching the importance of long lifetime lithium-ion batteries for the energy transition to Global Electrification.
- The Advanced Environmental Solutions prize was awarded to Philippe Ciais, from the Laboratoire des Sciences du Climat et de l’Environnement (France), for his contribution to understanding carbon uptake by terrestrial ecosystems to mitigate climate change.
- The Energy Frontiers prize has been awarded to Lydéric Bocquet, from the Ecole Normale Supérieure (France), for his research about the power of osmotic energy.
- The Young Researcher of the Year prizes were awarded to Maria Basso from the Università degli Studi di Padova (Italy), who studied solution-based oxide films for clean energy applications, and Virginia Venezia from the Università degli Studi di Napoli Federico II (Italy), who researched multifunctional hybrid materials from biowaste valorization.
- The Young Talents from Africa prizes were awarded to Asengo Gerardin Mabia from the Institut National Polytechnique Félix Houphouët-Boigny (Ivory Coast) for the synthesis of Polylactic Acid (PLA) from sugarcane molasses using cocoa husks as Enzyme Immobilization Support and to Shimaa Farag from The American University in Cairo (Egypt) for her research on tailored enzymatic based treatment of wastewater to detoxify heavy metals and degrade antibiotics.

== 2026 recipients ==
Prizes awarded in 2026 include:

- The Energy Transition prize was awarded to Véronique Gouverneur of the University of Oxford (United Kingdom) for her research on future-proofing fluorine chemistry.
- The Advanced Environmental Solutions prize was awarded to John F. Hartwig of the University of California, Berkeley (United States) for his research on the catalytic deconstruction and construction of polyolefins and organic molecules.
- The Energy Frontiers prize was awarded to Laura Gagliardi of the University of Chicago (United States) for her research on the computational and data-driven design of reticular frameworks for CO_{2} capture, water harvesting and hydrogen catalysis.
- The Young Researcher of the Year prizes were awarded to Leonardo Magherini of the Politecnico di Torino (Italy) for his research on the dual role of colloidal particles in the environment as emerging contaminants and agents for groundwater remediation, and to Filippo Trevisi of the Politecnico di Milano (Italy) for his work on the conceptual design of windplanes for airborne wind energy.
- The Young Talents from Africa prizes were awarded to Nosakhare Aigbedion of the Pan African University Institute for Basic Sciences, Technology and Innovation (Kenya) for his research on the development of CoCrFeNi-based high-entropy alloys for high-temperature thermal energy storage systems, and to Gosego Keotshepile Mapula Sedikelo of the University of South Africa (South Africa) for her research on recycling lithium-ion battery cathode material using an ultrasound-assisted electrochemical recovery method.

== Bibliography ==
- (en) Marcello Boldrini, Mattei, Rome, Colombo, 1969
- (it) Marcello Colitti, Energia e sviluppo in Italia, Bari, De Donato, 1979
- (en) Paul H. Frankel, Oil and Power Policy, New York - Washington, Praeger, 1966
