= Marie-Hélène =

Feminine given name

Marie-Hélène is a feminine compound given name. Notable people with the name include:

- Marie-Hélène Amiable (born 1960), French politician, Mayor of Bagneux
- Marie-Hélène Arnaud (1934–1986), French model and actress
- Marie-Hélène Aubert (born 1955), French politician, Member of the European Parliament for the West of France
- Marie Helene Aul (1893–1955), Estonian politician
- Marie-Hélène Beaulieu (born 1979), Canadian glass artist
- Marie-Hélène Bellavance, Canadian artist, actress and dancer
- Marie-Helene Bertino, American novelist
- Marie-Hélène Mathey Boo Lowumba (born 1943), ambassador of the Democratic Republic of Congo to the United States
- Marie-Hélène Cardot (1899–1977), French resistance leader and politician
- Marie-Helene Carleton, American photographer, writer and filmmaker
- Marie-Hélène Chisholm (born 1979), Canadian judoka
- Marie-Hélène Cousineau, Canadian film director and producer
- Marie-Hélène Crombé-Berton (born 1960), Belgian politician, member of the Belgian Senate
- Marie-Hélène Descamps (1938–2020), French politician, Member of the European Parliament for Central France
- Marie-Hélène Dozo, Belgian film editor with more than forty film credits
- Marie-Hélène des Esgaulx (born 1950), French politician, member of the Senate of France
- Marie-Hélène Estienne, French playwright and screenwriter
- Marie-Hélène Falcon (born 1942), former artistic director for theatre and dance in Quebec
- Marie Helene Franey (1898–1953), American educator and Catholic leader
- Élisabeth Philippine Marie Hélène de France (1764–1794), French princess
- Marie-Hélène Gaudreau (born 1976), Canadian politician, elected to the House of Commons
- Ginette Marie Hélène Jullian (1917–1962), codenamed Adele, French WWII agent of the United Kingdom's clandestine Special Operations Executive
- Marie-Hélène Lafon (born 1962), French educator and writer
- Marie-Hélène Lefaucheux (1904–1964), French women's and human rights activist
- Marie-Hélène Lentini, French actress and comedian
- Marie-Hélène Mathieu (born 1929), French disability rights activist
- Marie-Helene Östlund (born 1966), Swedish cross-country skier
- Marie-Hélène Peugeot-Roncoroni (born 1961), French heiress and businesswoman
- Marie-Hélène Pierre (born 1978), Mauritian badminton player
- Marie-Hélène Poitras (born 1975), Canadian writer living in Montreal, Quebec
- Marie-Hélène Prémont (born 1977), Canadian cross-country mountain biker
- Marie-Hélène de Rothschild (1927–1996), French socialite, member of the Rothschild banking family of France
- Marie-Hélène Sachet (1922–1986), French botanist
- Marie-Hélène Sajka (born 1997), French handball player
- Marie-Hélène Schiffers, Belgian racing cyclist
- Marie-Hélène Schwartz (1913–2013), French mathematician, worked on characteristic numbers of spaces with singularities
- Marie-Hélène Syre (born 1958), French equestrian
- Marie-Hélène Thoraval (born 1966), French politician, Mayor of Romans-sur-Isère, member of the Regional council of Auvergne-Rhône-Alpes
- Marie-Hélène Turcotte (born 1971), Canadian animation film director and artist
- Marie-Hélène Verlhac, French cellular biologist specialising in the final stages of oocyte development

== See also ==
- Maria Helena
- Marie (given name)
- Helene (name)
