= Jürgen Caro =

German chemist (born 1951)

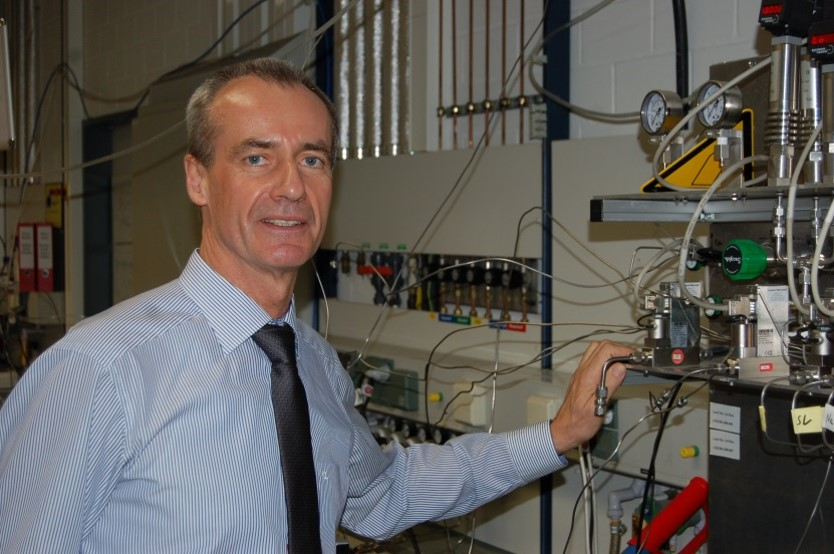
Caro in 2019

Jürgen Caro (born 27 December 1951 in Burgstädt, Saxony) is a German chemist.

== Life and career ==
Caro studied chemistry at Leipzig University from 1970 to 1974. His PhD (Dr. rer. nat.) work on diffusion in zeolites was done from 1975 to 1977 at the Physical Institute of the Leipzig University under the supervision of Jörg Kärger. After 1977, Caro was a postdoc at the Central Institute for Physical Chemistry of the Academy of Sciences (AdW) of the GDR in Berlin-Adlershof. He worked in different positions, by the end as Vice Director, in the fields of gas adsorption, heterogeneous catalysis and membrane permeation. In 1989 he earned the title Dr. sc. nat. with a thesis on the influence of mass transport in zeolite catalysis.

After the closure of the Academy of Sciences by 31 December 1991, Caro founded the research group "Nano-Composites". This group was the germ cell of the Department of "Functional materials" in the newly founded Institute of Applied Chemistry (ACA). Under the directorship of Manfred Baerns, Caro was one of the deputy directors at ACA with responsibility for the research field "Reaction engineering and new materials." In 1992 Caro completed his habilitation at Leipzig University on adsorption and catalysis in nanoporous materials and earned the title Dr. sc. nat. habil.

In 2001 Caro became W3-Professor for Physical Chemistry at Hannover University, the later Leibniz University Hannover. The successors of this chair were Gerhard Ertl and Hermann Schmalzried. In Hannover Caro focused his research activities on gas separation membranes and their use in catalytic membrane reactors for process intensification. With research projects on membranes and membrane reactors, Caro was a partner in numerous projects of the European Community Research in the 7th Framework Program such as CARENA, NASA-OTM, NEXT-GTL, and M4CO2, as well as co-founder of the Network of Excellence NoE INSIDE PORES, the later European Nanoporous Materials Institute of Excellence (ENMIX).

Caro has an intense cooperation with China. Caro was and is host of several Chinese Humboldt-Research-Fellows (Haihui Wang, Yanshuo Li, Yi Liu, Yanying Wei, Hongwei Fan) and PostDocs (Aisheng Huang). Caro supervised several Chinese PhD students (Heqing Jiang, Zhengwen Cao, Nanyi Wang, Fangyi Liang). Caro had and has different professorships in China: guest professor at the Chinese Academy of Sciences (CAS) in Ningbo (2013–2016), guest professor at Dalian University of Technology (2014–2017) and visiting professor at the University Panjin (2014–2017). Since 2018 Caro is full distinguished professor at the South China University of Technology, School of Chemistry and Chemical Engineering, in Guangzhou (Canton). In 2015 Caro founded together with his Chinese partner Haihui Wang the Sino-German Joint Lab of Inorganic Membranes, located jointly in Hannover and Guangzhou.

In 2013 Caro got together with Michael Tsapatsis (Univ. of Minnesota) the Breck Award of the International Zeolite Association (IZA).

In 2013 Caro was awarded with the Ostwald-Medal of the Saxon Academy of Sciences.

In 2016 Caro became elected corresponding member of the Saxon Academy of Sciences at Leipzig, Class for Mathematics and Science.

From 2016-2020, Caro was president of the Society of German Chemists GDCh district Hannover.

In 2019 he was awarded with the literature price of chemical industry (Fonds der Chemischen Industrie) together with his co-authors Armin Bunde, Jörg Kärger und Gero Vogl for the book "Diffusive Spreading in Nature, Technology and Society".

Jürgen Caro was awarded with the €200.000 endowed prize Advanced Environmental Solutions prize of the ENI award 2020, together Jörg Kärger from Leibzig, for their work leading to the development of micro-imaging techniques for the observation of diffusive molecule flows in nanoporous materials.

Caro retired in March 2020.

Caro has been named a Highly Cited Researcher by Web of Science five times in a row, 2021–2025.

Caro is the author of 450 publications, 10 book chapters, 43 patents and patent applications. 38,000 citations, h-factor 100 (Google Scholar 2024).

== Publications ==
- Bunde, Armin (2018). Diffusive spreading in nature, technology and society. Cham, Switzerland: Springer. ISBN 978-3-319-67797-2. OCLC 1017489274.
- Schüth, Ferdi (2002). Handbook of porous solids. Weinheim, Germany: Wiley-VCH. ISBN 3-527-30246-8. OCLC 264620662.
- R. Dittmeyer, J. Caro, Catalytic Membrane Reactors, Ertl, G (2008). Handbook of heterogeneous catalysis. Weinheim Chichester: Wiley-VCH John Wiley, distributor. ISBN 978-3-527-31241-2. OCLC 214304165.
- J. Caro, Basic Aspects of Membrane Reactors, Drioli, E (2010). Comprehensive membrane science and engineering. Amsterdam London: Elsevier Science. ISBN 978-0-08-093250-7. OCLC 656361209.
