= Choi Jin-ho =

Choi Jin-ho (Korean: 최진호) is a Korean name consisting of the family name Choi and the given name Jin-ho, and may also refer to:

- Choi Jin-ho (actor) (born 1968), South Korean actor
- Choi Jin-ho (footballer) (born 1989), South Korean footballer
- Choi Jin-ho (golfer), born 1984, South Korean golfer
- Choy Jin-ho (born 1948), South Korean chemist
