= Bernhard Kölver =

Bernhard Kölver (1938 – 2001) was a German Indologist, specializing for most of his career in the study of Nepal.

Kölver was born in Cologne, Germany. He received his PhD with a dissertation on Tokharian nominal morphology from Cologne University in 1965. He was professor of Indology in Kiel, Germany (1974-1993) and Leipzig, Germany (1993-).

After a trip to Nepal Kölver specialized in the study of this country, especially the Newar language. In 1995 he was elected to the Saxon Academy of Sciences in Leipzi]. He was also awarded the Triśaktipaṭṭabhūṣaṇa by King Birendra of Nepal in honor of his service to scholarship.

== Works ==
- Kölver, Bernhard 1969. Tulu texts, with glossary. Dravidian tales from the south of India. Publisher: Wiesbaden, F. Steiner, 1969.
- Kölver, Bernhard (1971). Textkritische und philologische Untersuchungen zur Rājataraṅgiṇī des Kalhana. Wiesbaden : F. Steiner, 1971.
- Kölver, Ulrike and Bernhard Kölver 1975. 'On Newari noun inflection.' Zentralasiaticshe Studien, 9:87-117. Wiesbaden: Otto Harrassowitz.
- Kölver, Ulrike and Bernhard Kölver 1978. 'Classical Newari verbal morphology." Zentralasiaticshe Studien 12: 273-316. Wiesbaden: Otto Harrassowitz.
- Kölver, Bernhard, and Hem Raj Shakya 1985. Documents from the Rudravarṇa-Mahāvihāra, Pāṭan. Sankt Augustin, VGH Wissenshaftsverlag.
- Gutschow, Niels, Bernhard Kölver, and Ishwaranand Shresthacarya 1987. Newar towns and buildings: an illustrated dictionary Newārī-English. Sankt Augustin: VGH Wissenschaftsverlag, 1987.
- Kölver, Bernhard 1992. Re-building a stūpa: architectural drawings of the Svayaṃbhūnāth. Bonn: VGH Wissenschaftsverlag.
- Kölver, Bernhard 1996. Constructing pagodas according to traditional Nepalese drawings. Berlin: Akademie Verlag.
