= Marcel Méchali =

Marcel Méchali (born in 1949) is a molecular biologist, Research Director at the CNRS, specialist in DNA and its replication. He is in charge of the genome replication and dynamics research team at the Institut de Génétique Humaine (IGH) of the CNRS of Montpellier. He was Director of this Institute from 2003 to 2006. He is also Director of Labex EpiGenMed, a network of 54 laboratories in Montpellier.

Marcel Méchali's work focuses on the mechanisms that allow the replication of our DNA at each division of our cells. He discovered several genetic and epigenetic elements that code the starting points of replication (origins of replication). Using a high-throughput approach, his lab has identified the genetic elements of the origins of replication in vertebrates and invertebrates. His work proposes a coupling between replication and gene expression as an essential phenomenon of embryonic development and evolution. They also open new perspectives for investigating the imbalances in the balance between cell proliferation and differentiation leading to cancer. A major contribution from his laboratory is also the discovery of several new replication genes. Three key replication genes were thus revealed: MCM8 and MCM9, encoding for two proteins allowing the opening of the DNA double helix for its duplication, and Cdt1 which allows these factors to be assembled on DNA. Finally, his laboratory was also the first to identify MCM4 as a cellular licensing factor, a replication step that is potentially altered in cancers. These factors are currently being evaluated as a diagnostic tool or therapeutic target of anticancer agents.

CNRS Silver medal in 1996, he became a member of the French Academy of sciences in 2005. He received the research prize from the Allianz-Institut de France Foundation in 2005 and the René and André Duquesne Prize from the Ligue contre le Cancer in 2009. He was made a Chevalier of the Légion d'Honneur in 2009 and a Chevalier of the Palmes Académiques in 2015.
