= Kim Jin-ho =

Kim Jin-ho (Korean: 김진호) is a Korean name consisting of the family name Kim and the given name Jin-ho, and may also refer to:

- Kim Jin-ho (general) (born 1941), South Korean Chairman of the Joint Chiefs of Staff
- Kim Jin-ho (archer) (born 1961), South Korean archer
- Kim Jin-ho (singer) (born 1986), South Korean singer
