= Gerlinde Huber-Rebenich =

German philologist

Gerlinde Huber-Rebenich (born in Mannheim, 1959) is a German philologist. She specializes in medieval and neo-Latin literature, and the medieval reception of Ovid.

== Education and career ==
Gerlinde Huber-Rebenich studied Latin and French at the University of Mannheim, the University of Nantes and the University of Lausanne. After a year of study at Corpus Christi College, Oxford University, she studied Latin philology at the University of Heidelberg from 1986 to 1989. In 1990, she received her doctorate in Mannheim with the thesis Das Motiv der "Witwe von Ephesus" in lateinischen Texten der Antike und des Mittelalters (The Motif of the 'Widow of Ephesus' in Latin Texts of Antiquity and the Middle Ages). Her habilitation took place in 1995 with Klassische Philologie unter Einbeziehung der Wirkungsgeschichte der lateinischen Literatur.

From 1989 to 1991 Huber-Rebenich worked as a research assistant at the Europa-Institut of the University of Mannheim on the research project Repertorium der textbegleitenden Druckgraphik zu Ovids Metamorphosen. She then worked at Heidelberg University Library, where she cataloged manuscripts. In 1995 she was appointed Professor of Medieval and Modern Latin at the University of Jena. In 2002, she was elected as a full member of the Saxon Academy of Sciences. She is a member of the Academy of Non-Profit Sciences in Erfurt. She was a lecturer in Latin philology from 2009 to 2010 at the University of Bern.

== Select publications ==
- Das Motiv der 'Witwe von Ephesus' in lateinischen Texten der Antike und des Mittelalters, Tübingen 1990
- Huber-Rebenich, Gerlinde / Lütkemeyer, Sabine / Walter, Hermann, Ikonographisches Repertorium zu den Metamorphosen des Ovid. Die textbegleitende Druckgraphik, Teil II: Sammeldarstellungen, Berlin 2004
- Huber-Rebenich, Gerlinde / Lütkemeyer, Sabine / Walter, Hermann, Ikonographisches Repertorium zu den Metamorphosen des Ovid. Die textbegleitende Druckgraphik, Teil I.1: Narrative Darstellungen, Berlin 2014
- Gerlinde Huber-Rebenich, Christian Rohr, and Michael Stolz Wasser in der mittelalterlichen Kultur : Gebrauch - Wahrnehmung - Symbolik = Water in medieval culture 16. Symposium des Mediävistenverbands e.V. vom 22. bis 25. März 2015 in Bern (Berlin: De Gruyter, 2015)
- Gerlinde Huber-Rebenich and Stefan Rebenich, eds.: Interreligiöse Konflikte im 4. und 5. Jahrhundert. Julian „Contra Galilaeos“ – Kyrill „Contra Iulianum“, Texte und Untersuchungen zur Geschichte der altchristlichen Literatur 181 (Berlin: de Gruyter) 2019
