= Bruno Giros =

French neuroscientist

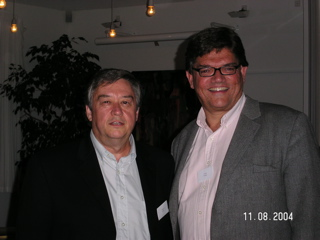
- Marc Caron (left) and Bruno Giros (right)
- Occupation: Neuroscientist
- Known for: Research on neurotransmitter systems in psychiatric disorders
- Title: Professor of Psychiatry, McGill University
- Awards: CNRS Silver Medal (1996); Canada Research Chair (2008); Member of the Academia Europaea (2022)

Academic background
- Education: University of Paris VI: Pierre et Marie-Curie

Academic work
- Discipline: Neuroscience
- Sub-discipline: Neurobiology, psychiatry
- Institutions: Université Pierre et Marie Curie; INSERM; McGill University

Bruno Giros is a French neuroscientist specializing in neurotransmitter systems and their role in psychiatric disorders, particularly schizophrenia. He is a professor of psychiatry and director of the Neurobiology and Psychiatry Laboratory at McGill University.

== Biography ==
Giros completed his PhD at the University of Paris VI: Pierre et Marie-Curie in 1987, where he conducted research in J.-C. Schwartz’s laboratory at INSERM U-109. He subsequently undertook postdoctoral training at Genentech, Inc. in San Francisco in 1987 and at Duke University from 1991 to 1994 in the laboratory of Marc G. Caron and Robert J. Lefkowitz.

From 1994 to 1998, Giros was director of the Neurobiology and Psychiatry Group at the Université Pierre et Marie Curie. He then led the INSERM U-513 “Neurobiology and Psychiatry” Laboratory at the same institution between 1999 and 2008. In 2007, he joined the Douglas Hospital Research Centre in Canada. The following year, he was appointed professor of psychiatry and director of the Neurobiology and Psychiatry Laboratory at McGill University.

In addition to his work at McGill, Giros directed the Neurobiology and Psychiatry Group at the Université Sorbonne from 2009 to 2013, and served as visiting professor and director of the Neurobiology and Psychiatry Group at the Université de Paris from 2018 to 2025.

== Honors and awards ==
- 1996: CNRS Silver Medal
- 2008: Canada Research Chair, "Neurobiology of Psychiatric Disorders"
- 2022: Heinz Lehmann Award, Canadian College of Neuropsycho Pharmacology (CCNP)
- 2022: Elected Member of the Academia Europaea
