= Chin Ho =

Chin Ho may refer to:

- Chin Ho Kelly, Hawaii Five-O character played by Kam Fong Chun, and later by Daniel Dae Kim
- Chin Haw, also spelled Chin Ho, Thai Chinese Muslims
- Chin Ho (name), Korean given name

== See also ==
- Chinn Ho (1904–1987), Chinese American entrepreneur in Hawaii
