= Wang Zhonglin =

Wang Zhonglin may refer to:

- Wang Zhonglin (politician) (Chinese: 王忠林; pinyin: Wáng Zhōnglín), born 1962.
- Zhong Lin Wang (Chinese: 王中林; pinyin: Wáng Zhōnglín), born 1961, a Chinese-American physicist, materials scientist and engineer.
