= Gary M. Mavko =

Gary Mavko
- Education: Stanford University, Cornell University
- Known for: Rock Physics; Seismic Wave Propagation; Squirt Flow
- Scientific career
- Fields: Geophysicist
- Workplaces: Stanford University
- Doctoral advisor: Amos Nur

Gary Mavko (1949) is an emeritus professor of geophysics at Stanford University. He received his Ph.D. in geophysics from Stanford in 1977. Gary then joined the Tectonophysics branch of the USGS in Menlo Park where he worked in areas of rock physics and earthquake fault mechanics. He returned to Stanford in February, 1989, and is now Professor (Research) of Geophysics. Mavko was a 2006 Distinguished Lecturer of the Society of Exploration Geophysicists. In 2001 he was elected an Honorary Member of the Society of Exploration Geophysicists "for his deep understanding of rock physics and for the distillation of his ideas into the “squirt” theory for porous, saturated rocks".

== Research ==
Gary Mavko co-directs the "Stanford Rock Physics and Borehole Geophysics Project" (SRB), a group of approximately 25 researchers (faculty, research associates, post-docs, and graduate students), working on problems related to wave propagation in earth materials - the field of Rock Physics. The goal is to better understand how rocks, pore fluids, and physical conditions of temperature and stress impact wave propagation, particularly in disordered, heterogeneous media.

== Awards ==
Mavko received the 2014 "New Frontiers of Hydrocarbons" (Upstream) ENI award together with Tapan Mukerji, Jack Dvorkin and Dario Grana.
