= Marie-Françoise André =

French geographer

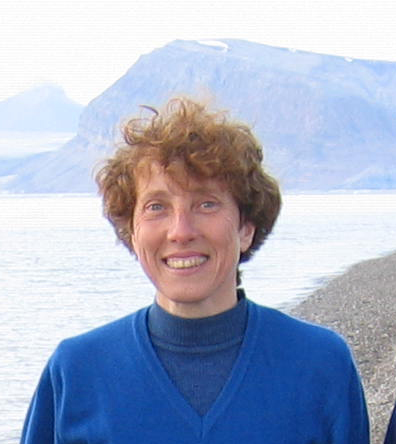
- Born: 1953 (age 72–73); Paris
- Awards: CNRS Silver Medal

Academic background
- Thesis: Slope processes and holocene evolution on Spitsbergen (Kongsfjord-Wijdefjord, 79 n) (1991)
- Doctoral advisor: Alain Godard

Academic work
- Discipline: Geographer
- Sub-discipline: Geomorphology; Erosion
- Institutions: Clermont Auvergne University; Blaise Pascal University

Marie-Françoise André (born 1953 in Paris) is a French geographer and geomorphologist specialising in landscape architecture in the polar regions (Labrador, Spitsbergen, Lapland, Antarctica). She also researched stone erosion in the context of heritage preservation, particularly in Angkor. Her work was awarded the silver medal from CNRS, the French national centre for scientific research.

== Biography ==
André completed her third-cycle thesis on the geomorphological evolution of Northern Labrador in 1981. Her state doctoral thesis was focused on the evolution of slopes in Spitsbergen. Advised by Alain Godard, she defended the thesis in 1991.

A teacher-researcher in geomorphology, she was a member of CNRS's URA 1562 team in Clermont-Ferrand in 1993. That same year, she joined the newly founded Physical and Environmental Geography Laboratory (GEOLAB) in the same year. She was director of GEOLAB for nine years, from 1998-2007.

She studied landscape changes over time and the influence of climatic variations in Swedish Lapland and the Antarctic Peninsula. She also published epistemological work on geomorphology and French research on the poles.

She lectured at the University of Limoges in 1994. From 1997-2016 she was a professor of geography at Blaise Pascal University.

In the 2010s, André conducted research on stone erosion in historic monuments. As part of the multidisciplinary Ta Keo project in Angkor her team used photogrammetry and geomatics to demonstrate deforestation had contributed to the temple's deterioration. For work on the degradation of monuments, as well as developing links between geomorphology and heritage, she was awarded a silver medal from CNRS. She continued her research in the French Massif Central, in Southern America's Guyana and in the Mediterranean islands of Malta and Cyprus.

She was a senior member of the Institut universitaire de France (IUF, Academic Institute of France) from 2010–2015.

On 1 January 2017, Blaise Pascal University became part of the University Clermont Auvergne, where she continued to teach. She is a member of the Académie des sciences d'outre-mer (Academy of Overseas Sciences).

Currently a Professor Emeritus, André is a doctoral advisor for student theses and publishes about polar landscapes.

== Awards ==
- CNRS silver medal (2011)

== Publications ==
- Monique Fort, Marie-Françoise André (2016-10-02). Landscapes and Landforms of France. Springer. p. 296. ISBN 978-9402406696.
- Alain Godard, Marie-Françoise André (2013-07-30). Les milieux polaires. Armand Colin. p. 460.
- Fabienne Lemarchand, Marie-Françoise André et Frédérique Rémy (2011-11-24). Cap sur les pôles : 100 questions sur les mondes polaires. Omniscience. p. 222.
- Le monde polaire : Mutations et transitions. Ellipses. 2005-12-14. p. 187.
