= Leanne Pitchford =

Plasma physicist

Leanne Carolyn Pitchford (born 1950) is a retired physicist known for her work on the numerical modeling of low-temperature plasma, and in the LXCat project for open exchange of low-temperature plasma data. Educated in the US, she worked in France as a director of research for the French National Centre for Scientific Research (CNRS), affiliated with the Laboratoire Plasma et Conversion d’Energie (Laplace) at the University of Toulouse.

== Education and career ==
Pitchford majored in physics and mathematics at East Texas State University (now Texas A&M University–Commerce), graduating in 1970. She went to the University of Texas at Dallas for doctoral study in physics, completing her Ph.D. there in 1976. Her dissertation, Development of a Quantitative Model for High Power Pulsed Lasers, was supervised by Carl B. Collins, and concerned gas lasers.

After postdoctoral research at CEA Paris-Saclay in France and at the Joint Institute for Laboratory Astrophysics (JILA) at the University of Colorado Boulder, she became a researcher and department manager at Sandia National Laboratories in 1980. After moving to GTE Laboratories in 1984, she moved again to CNRS and Laplace in 1989, and remained there for the rest of her career.

== Recognition ==
Pitchford received the CNRS Silver Medal in 1999. She was one of two recipients of the 2015 Von Engel & Franklin Prize in plasma physics, given at the International Conference on Phenomena in Ionized Gases for her "outstanding contributions to the physics and technology of ionized gases, the understanding of the processes that take place in dielectric barrier discharges, the study of spaceship propulsion systems and in the construction of basic data benchmarks for ionized gases". In 2018, the American Physical Society (APS) gave her their Will Allis Prize for the Study of Ionized Gases, "for the development and application of methods to accurately compute rate coefficients and charged particle transport coefficients, and their application to predictive modeling of low-temperature plasmas".

She was elected as a Fellow of the American Physical Society in 2019, after a nomination from the APS Forum on Industrial & Applied Physics, "for outstanding service to the industrial and applied physics communities in the area of low-temperature plasma modeling through the development of new approaches for solution of the electron gas Boltzmann equation, modeling software, evaluated data sets, and open-access websites". She is also a Fellow of the Institute of Physics.
