= Anca Muscholl =

Romanian-German mathematical logician

Anca Muscholl (born 1967) is a Romanian-German mathematical logician and theoretical computer scientist known for her work on formal verification, model checking, and two-variable logic. She is a researcher at the Laboratoire bordelais de recherche en informatique (LaBRI), a professor at the University of Bordeaux, and a former junior member of the Institut Universitaire de France.

== Education and career ==
Muscholl was born in Bucharest, came to Germany as a teenage refugee in 1984, and won first place in two German national mathematics competitions (the Bundeswettbewerb Mathematik) in 1985 and 1986. She earned a master's degree at the Technical University of Munich, and completed her Ph.D. at the University of Stuttgart in 1994. Her dissertation, Über die Erkennbarkeit unendlicher Spuren, was supervised by Volker Diekert and published by Teubner Verlag in 1996. She also earned a habilitation at the University of Stuttgart in 1999.

After becoming a professor at Paris Diderot University in 1999, she moved to the University of Bordeaux in 2006.

== Recognition ==
Muscholl was a junior member of the Institut Universitaire de France from 2007 to 2012. She won the CNRS Silver Medal in 2010.
