= Nam-Gyu Park =

South Korean chemist (born 1960)

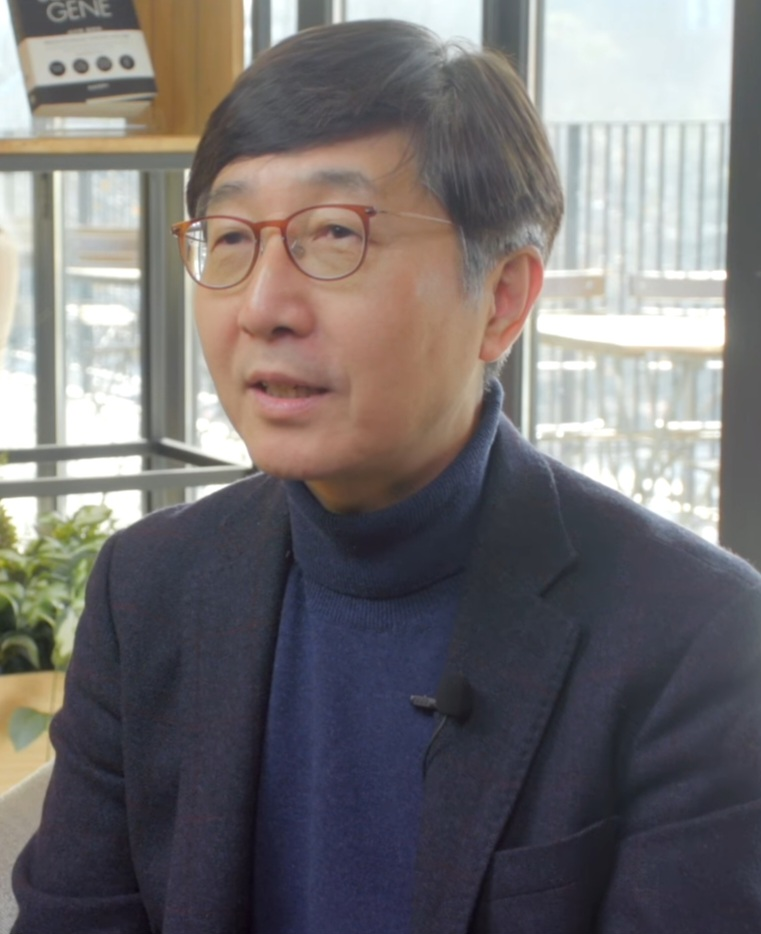
- Nam-Gyu Park in 2020
- Born: September 3, 1960 (age 66); Masan, South Gyeongsang Province, South Korea (now Changwon, South Gyeongsang Province, South Korea)
- Education: Seoul National University (MS, PhD)
- Known for: first reported a long-term stable perovskite solar cell
- Awards: Clarivate Citation Laureate (2017); Ho-Am Prize in Engineering (2018); Rank Prizes for Optoelectronics (2022); ENI award for Energy Frontiers (2024); Humboldt Research Award (2025); Kyung-Ahm Prize for Natural Sciences (2026)
- Scientific career
- Fields: Chemical engineering
- Workplaces: Sungkyunkwan University
- Doctoral advisor: Choy Jin-ho
- Other academic advisors: Guy Campet (postdoc); Arthur J. Frank (postdoc)

Korean name
- Hangul: 박남규
- Hanja: 朴南圭
- RR: Bak Namgyu
- MR: Pak Namgyu

Nam-Gyu Park (Korean: 박남규; born 3 September 1960) is a South Korean chemical engineer. He is Distinguished Professor and Sungkyunkwan University (SKKU)-Fellow at School of Chemical Engineering, SKKU. His research focuses on high efficiency mesoscopic nanostructured solar cells. He announced the beginning of perovskite photovoltaic research by first reporting long-term stable perovskite solar cells in 2012, and is called the pioneer of practical perovskite solar cells.

== Career ==
He is from Masan, South Gyeongsang Province (now Changwon). When he was young, his father was transferred to the Busan branch of Korea Electric Power Corporation, so he moved to Busan and received his elementary, middle, and high school education there. As a teenager, he wanted to be an artist or architect, but he couldn't due to opposition from his music teacher. Upon entering the Department of Chemistry Education at Seoul National University in 1981, he joined the 9th Infantry Division (also known as the White Horse Division) and served for two years and seven months. He returned to Seoul National University after being discharged from the military in 1984, majored in inorganic chemistry, and graduated with a bachelor's degree in 1988.

Since January 1988, he worked as a researcher at SKC (formerly known as Sunkyung Chemical)'s Cheonan plant, which was then well-known as a videotape, compact disc and floppy disk manufacturer, but he resigned in February 1990. He then attended the Department of Chemistry at Seoul National University and became a student of Professor Choy Jin-ho. At first, he wanted to study superconductors, but changed his direction to perovskite research at the suggestion of the professor. In February 1992, he earned his master's degree in inorganic chemistry from Seoul National University graduate school, and in February 1995, he earned his doctorate in inorganic chemistry through a paper titled "Synthesis and physico-chemical properties of 2-dimensional inorganic solids and their intercalation compounds".

From March 1996 to May 1997, he worked as a postdoctoral researcher at the Institut de Chimie de la Matiere Condensee de Bordeaux – Centre National de la Recherche Scientifique (ICMCB-CNRS) in Pessac, France, and conducted research to improve efficiency of dye-sensitized solar cells. From June 1997 to December 1999, he worked as a postdoctoral researcher at the National Renewable Energy Laboratory (NREL) in Golden, Colorado, the United States. After returning to South Korea in January 2000, he worked as a senior researcher at the Electronics and Telecommunications Research Institute (ETRI), and moved to the Korea Institute of Science and Technology (KIST) in December 2005 as the head of the solar cell research center and the head of the energy materials research center. However, dye-sensitized solar cells have some disadvantages in that they are economical but have limited energy conversion efficiency. Meanwhile, at a solar cell-related conference held in Switzerland in 2007, Tsutomu Miyasaka, a professor at Toin University of Yokohama, Japan, presented a presentation on perovskite solar cells. In a paper published in 2009, Tsutomu Miyasaka first presented a dye-sensitized solar cell model with perovskite structural materials, but it was implemented in a liquid state, making it less stable and only 3.8% efficient, so it received little attention.

When he was appointed as a professor at Sungkyunkwan University in July 2009, he conducted research on perovskites, and paid attention to the fact that the perovskite structural compounds have superconductivity along with properties of nonconductors, semiconductors, and conductors and thus have properties that absorb light well. In August 2012, he developed the world's first solar cell made of solid perovskite with Professor Michael Grätzel at the École Polytechnique Fédérale de Lausanne, Switzerland. The solid perovskite solar cell he developed recorded the highest efficiency at the time of 9.7%, and the efficiency remained constant even when exposed to the outside for more than 500 hours. Published in the journal Scientific Reports, a sister paper of Nature, it was considered the first paper on a stable and efficient solid perovskite solar cell. Since then, it has been evaluated as providing an opportunity to conduct research on perovskite solar cells around the world. His perovskite solar cell research achievements gained international recognition by winning the British Rank Prizes for Optoelectronics in 2022, the Italian ENI award for Energy Frontiers in 2024, and the German Humboldt Research Award in 2025. In 2023, he was the only South Korean scientists and technicians to be invited to the Nobel Symposium hosted by the Royal Swedish Academy of Sciences to present solid perovskite solar cells.

== Selected awards and honors ==
- Aug. 2008: KIST Award of Month, KIST
- Oct. 2008: Scientist of the Month, Ministry of Science and ICT and National Research Foundation of Korea
- Oct. 2008: Kyunhang Electricity and Energy Award, Korean Government
- 2009: Best KIST Award, KIST
- 2010: DuPont Science and Technology Award, DuPont Korea
- 2013: 100 National Outstanding Awards, Korean Government
- 2014: MRS Outstanding Research Award, MRS
- 2014: WCPEC-6 Paper Award, Kyoto, Japan
- 2015: Hamakawa Award of PVSEC, Busan, Korea
- 2016: Dukmyung KAST Engineering Award, KAST
- 2017: Clarivate Citation Laureates, Clarivate Analytics
- 2018: ACS-KCS Excellence Award, American Chemical Society
- 2018: Lee Hsun Lecture Award, Chinese Academy of Sciences
- 2018: Ho-Am Prize in Engineering, Ho-Am Foundation
- 2018: Prime Minister Award, No. 6912
- 2018: Minister of Science Award, No. 25595
- 2018: Scientist of the Year Award
- 2019: Asian Scientist 100, Asian Scientist
- 2020: 1st Jin-Ho Choy Academic Award, Korean Chemical Society
- 2021: NANO
- 2022: Rank Prizes for Optoelectronics
- 2023: Highly Cited Researcher in the field of Materials Science - 2023
- 2024: Top Scientist and Technologist Award of Korea
- 2024: ENI award for Energy Frontiers
- 2024: NAEK Award, National Academy of Engineering of Korea
- 2025: Humboldt Research Award
- 2025: NIMS Award
- 2026: Kyung-Ahm Prize for Natural Sciences

== Patents ==
- Perovskite Solar Cell

== Books ==
- "Organic-Inorganic Halide Perovskite Photovoltaics" Ed. N.-G. Park, M. Gratzel and T. Miyasaka, Springer (2016), ISBN 978-3-319-35114-8
- "High Efficiency Mesoscopic Organometal Halide Perovskite Solar Cells" in "Unconventional Thin Film Photovoltaics", Ed. Enrico Da Como, Filippo De Angelis, Henry Snaith, Alison Walker, Royal Society of Chemistry (2016), ISBN 978-1-78262-293-2
- "Sensitized Mesoscopic Solar Cells" McGraw-Hill Yearbook of Science and Technology (2015), ISBN 978-0-07-183576-3
- "Perovskite Solar Cell" in "Advanced concepts in photovoltaics", Ed. A.J. Nozik, Royal Society of Chemistry (2014), ISBN 978-1-84973-591-9
- "Advanced technologies of perovskite-based thin film solar cells" in "Recent development of perovskite thin film solar cells", Ed. T. Miyasaka and H. Segawa, CMC Publishing Co., Japan (2014), ISBN 978-4- 907837-25-9 C3058.
- "Perovskite-based solid state hybrid solar cells" in "Trends in Advanced Sensitized and Organic Solar Cells", Ed. T. Miyasaka, CMC Publishing Co, Japan (2012), ISBN 978-4-7813-0620-9 C3054
- "Metal oxide nanostructures and their photovoltaic applications" in "Metal Oxide Nanostructures and Their Applications", Ed. Ahmad Umar, American Science Publisher, USA (2009), ISBN 1-58883-170-1
- "Research trend of dye-sensitized solar cell in Korea" in "Recent Advances in Research and Development for Dye-Sensitized Solar Cells II", Ed. H. Arakawa, CMC Publishing Co, Japan (2007), ISBN 978-4- 88231-665-7 C3054

== Publications ==
1. Scalable fabrication and coating methods for perovskite solar cells and solar modules, Nature Materials Review 5, 333–350 (2020)
2. High-Efficiency Perovskite Solar Cells, Chem. Rev. 120, 7867−7918 (2020)
3. Multifunctional Chemical Linker Imidazoleacetic Acid Hydrochloride for 21% Efficient and Stable Planar Perovskite Solar Cells, Adv. Mater. 1902902 (2019)
4. Bi-facial stamping for High Efficiency Perovskite Solar Cells, Energy & Environ. Sci., 12, 308 (2018)
5. Printable organometallic perovskite enables large-area, low-dose X-ray imaging, Nature, 550, 87 (2017)
6. Towards stable and commercially available perovskite solar cells, Nature Energy, 1, 16152 (2016)
7. Self-formed grain boundary healing layer for highly efficient CH3NH3PbI3 perovskite solar cells, Nature Energy, 1, 16081, (2016)
8. Growth of CH3NH3PbI3 cuboids with controlled size for high-efficiency perovskite solar cells, Nature Nanotechnology, 9, 927 (2014)
9. Water photolysis at 12.3% efficiency via perovskite photovoltaics and Earth-abundant catalysts, Science, 26, 1593 (2014)
10. Mechanism of carrier accumulation in perovskite thin-absorber solar cells, Nature Communications, 4, 2242 (2013)
11. Organometal perovskite light absorbers toward a 20% efficiency low-cost solid-state mesoscopic solar cell, J. Phys. Chem. Letters, 4, 2423 (2013) (Cover)
12. Lead iodide perovskite sensitized all-solid-state submicron thin film mesoscopic solar cell with efficiency exceeding 9%, Scientific Reports (Nature Publishing), 2, 591 (2012) Highly cited article
13. 6.5% efficient perovskite quantum-dot-sensitized solar cell, Nanoscale, 3, 4088 (2011)
14. Selective positioning of organic dyes in a mesoporous inorganic oxide films, Nature Materials, 8, 665 (2009)
