= Gabriel Peyré =

French applied mathematician

- Awards: Blaise Pascal Prize (2017) of the Académie des sciences Enrico Magenes Prize (2019) of the Unione Matematica Italiana
- Scientific career
- Fields: Applied mathematics
- Institutions: ENS and CNRS

Gabriel Peyré (born 1979) is a French mathematician. Most of his work lies in the field of transportation theory. He is a CNRS senior researcher and a Professor in the mathematics and applications department of the École normale supérieure in Paris. He was awarded the CNRS Silver Medal in 2021.

== Life and work ==
His work mainly focuses on applied mathematics, in particular on the imaging sciences and machine learning applications of optimal transport.

Gabriel Peyré is also the deputy director of the 3IA Paris Artificial Intelligence Research Institute as well as a member of the scientific committee of the ENS center for data science. He is also the creator of the Numerical tour of data science, a popular online repository of Python/Matlab/Julia/R resources to teach mathematical data sciences. He is a frequent collaborator of the INRIA team Mokaplan.

== Awards and distinctions ==
Gabriel Peyré was awarded the Blaise Pascal Prize in 2017 from the Académie des sciences as well as the Enrico Magenes Prize (2019) from the Unione Matematica Italiana. He also was an invited speaker at the European Congress of Mathematics in 2020. His research was supported by an ERC starting grant in 2012 and by an ERC consolidator grant in 2017. In 2021, he was awarded the CNRS Silver Medal.

== Major publications ==
- Benamou, J.-D., Carlier, G., Cuturi, M., Nenna, L., & Peyré, G. (2015). Iterative bregman projections for regularized transportation problems [Publisher: Society for Industrial and Applied Mathematics]. SIAM Journalon Scientific Computing, 37(2), A1111–A1138.
- Peyré, G., Bougleux, S., & Cohen, L. (2008). Non-local regularization of inverse problems. In D. Forsyth, P. Torr, & A. Zisserman (Eds.), Computer vision – ECCV 2008 (pp. 57–68). Springer.
- Peyré, G., & Cuturi, M. (2019). Computational optimal transport: With applications to data science [Publisher: Now Publishers, Inc.]. Foundations and Trends in Machine Learning, 11(5), 355–607.
- Rabin, J., Peyré, G., Delon, J., & Bernot, M. (2012). Wasserstein barycenter and its application to texture mixing. In A. M. Bruckstein, B. M. ter Haar Romeny, A. M. Bronstein, & M. M. Bronstein (Eds.), Scale spaceand variational methods in computer vision (pp. 435–446). Springer.
- Solomon, J., de Goes, F., Peyré, G., Cuturi, M., Butscher, A., Nguyen, A., Du, T., & Guibas, L. (2015). Convolutional wasserstein distances: Efficient optimal transportation on geometric domains. ACM Transactions on Graphics, 34(4), 66:1–66:11.
