= Marc Fontecave =

French chemist (born 1956)

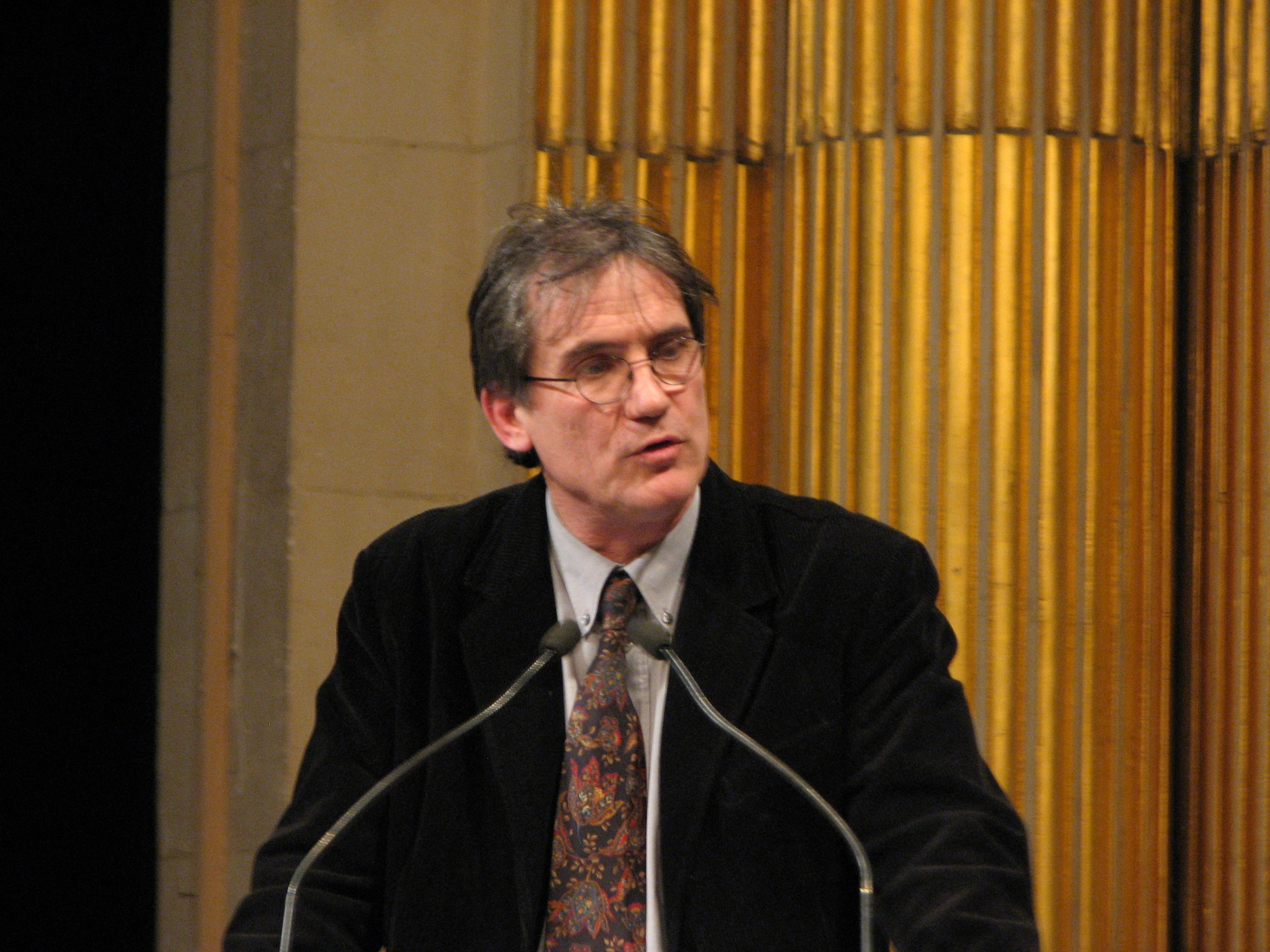
Marc Fontecave, Member of the French Academy of Sciences

Marc Fontecave (born 27 September 1956) is a French chemist. An international specialist in bioinorganic chemistry, he currently teaches at the Collège de France in Paris, where he heads the Laboratory of Chemistry of Biological Processes.

== Biography ==
Marc Fontecave is a graduate of the École normale supérieure de l'enseignement technique (which became the École normale supérieure Paris-Saclay in 2016), and holds a doctorate in science.

In 2005, he was elected a member of the French Academy of Sciences and in 2019 foreign member of the Royal Swedish Academy of Sciences. Since 2008–2009, he holds the Chair of Chemistry of Biological Processes at the Collège de France.

He chairs the Fondation du Collège de France and is a member of the EDF scientific council.

== Research studies ==
Marc Fontecave has deepened his understanding of the structure and reactivity of the metal centres present in metalloproteins. Its research can have applications in the fields of chemistry (selective catalysts), health (anti-cancer, antioxidants), environment (bioremediation, green chemistry) and energy (hydrogen production and carbon dioxide transformation).

== Awards and honours ==
- 2024: ENI award for Energy Transition
- 2015: Chevalier of the Légion d'Honneur
- 2011: Achille-Le-Bel Grand Prize of the Société Chimique de France
- 2010: Chevalier of the Ordre National du Mérite
- 2009: Sir Raman Chair of the Indian Academy of Sciences
- 2005: Member of the French Academy of Sciences
- 2005: Senior member of the Institut Universitaire de France (IUF)
- 2004: CNRS Silver medal
- 1996: Policart-Lacassagne Prize of the French Academy of Sciences
- 1991–1996: Junior member of IUF.

== Position statements ==
He intervened in the public debate to encourage public reappropriation of major scientific research and simplification of the French research system; according to him, the evaluation of researchers a posteriori is the only method for taking the necessary risks in research.

During the reflection on the energy transition, with his colleagues from the French Academy of Sciences, he encouraged the use of nuclear and shale gas. As the problem of storing and restoring intermittent renewable energies has not been solved, he criticizes the forced march towards energy transition. He argues that the intensification of nuclear use is a necessity to reduce CO_{2} emissions.

On 29 December 2018, he strongly criticised L'Affaire du siècle, a successful petition in a World Forum calling for the French State to be condemned for its failure to respect climate commitments, as "unfair, stupid, and ineffective".

== Publication ==
Chemistry of biological processes: an introduction, Paris, Éditions Fayard, "Collège de France" series, 2009, 60 p. (ISBN 9782213654225, LCCN 2010-363521)

== Article ==
Ecology: "There is no chance of a revolution happening "2 on lemonde.fr on 3 September 2018
