= Jörg Kärger =

German physicist (born 1943)

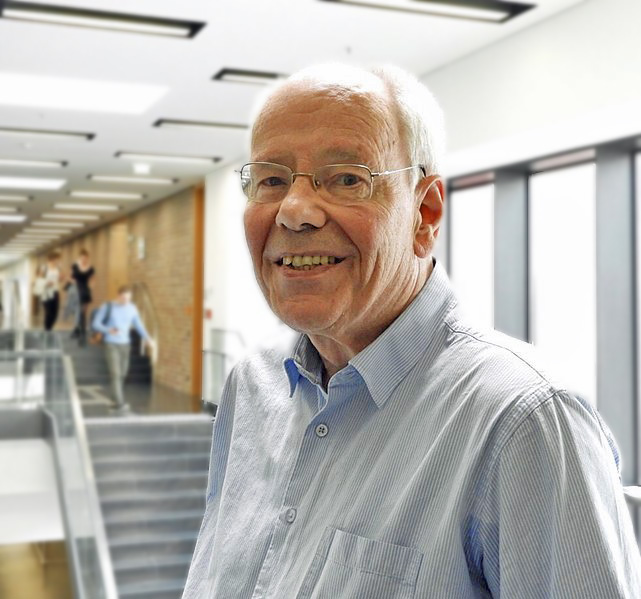
- Jörg Kärger, Leipzig University in 2019
- Born: 3 October 1943; Erfurt, Germany
- Education: Leipzig University
- Known for: Nuclear magnetic resonance spectroscopy Diffusion in Zeolites
- Awards: Gustav Hertz Prize, Breck Award, Max Planck Research Award, ENI award, Otto Stern Prize, Theodor-Litt-Prize
- Scientific career
- Fields: Physics
- Workplaces: Leipzig University
- Doctoral advisor: Harry Pfeifer

Jörg Kärger (born 3 October 1943) is a German physicist.

== Life and work ==
Jörg Kärger was born in Erfurt. After attending school in Erfurt and Leipzig, he studied physics at the University of Leipzig, whose member he remained in the subsequent years, interrupted by guest stays in Prague, Leningrad, Moscow, Paris and Fredericton/Canada. His doctorate in 1970 with the dissertation "The diffusion of water at 13X zeolites: investigated by the method of nuclear magnetic resonance with the aid of pulsed field gradients" under the supervision of Harry Pfeifer was followed in 1978 by his doctorate B (1991 with conversion to habilitation) as well as the appointment to an extraordinary professorship in 1989 and a full professorship for experimental physics / interface physics in 1994.

His scientific career was determined by his work on the use of NMR spectroscopy to measure molecular diffusion in nanoporous materials (zeolites), which he had already begun during his doctorate. After his measurements, existing ideas had to be corrected by orders of magnitude, which led to a paradigm shift in the understanding of molecular mass transport in such systems. The mechanism of two-range diffusion he applied became a widely used model for NMR diffusion measurements in complex systems, including their use for magnetic resonance imaging. His monographs Diffusion in Zeolites and Other Microporous Solids (Wiley, 1992, together with D. M. Ruthven) and Diffusion in Nanoporous Materials (together with D. M. Ruthven and D. N. Theodorou) became core literature in sorption research, i.e. in the investigation of the behavior of molecules in interaction with interfaces. His work was recognized with the award of the Gustav Hertz Prize of the GDR Physical Society (1978, together with Harry Pfeifer), the Breck Award of the International Zeolite Association (1986, together with Harry Pfeifer, Dieter Freude and Martin Bülow) and the Max Planck Research Award (1993, together with Douglas M. Ruthven). He is the author of over 500 papers in periodicals, author/editor of 10 books.

Together with Paul Heitjans, he initiated the Diffusion Fundamentals conference series, which is devoted to the phenomena of random movement and propagation in their entirety. The objects considered can thus be of a material or immaterial nature and range from atoms and molecules as the traditional objects of diffusion research to new species in the animal and plant world and new words in our vocabulary. Since the 6th conference 2015 in Dresden the conference series with the accompanying Diffusion-Fundamentals-Online-Journal has been under the auspices of the Saxon Academy of Sciences and Humanities in Leipzig.

The Dresden conference gave rise to the edition of a book on "Diffusive Spreading in Nature, Technology and Society", for which he, together with Armin Bunde, Jürgen Caro and Gero Vogl, was awarded the Literature Prize of the Fonds der Chemischen Industrie in 2019.

In 2020 he and Jürgen Caro, his first doctoral student, received the ENI award in the “Advanced Environmental Solutions” category for their work, which led to the development of micro-imaging methods for the observation of diffusive molecular flows in nanoporous materials. In 2022, Jörg Kärger was awarded the Otto Stern Prize by the Magnetic Resonance Division of the German Chemical Society, in recognition of his fundamental contributions to the application of nuclear magnetic resonance (NMR) spectroscopy.

In 2005, Kärger was awarded the Theodor Litt Prize of the University of Leipzig for his merits in teaching. His Sunday lectures at the Faculty of Physics and Earth Sciences with up to 500 listeners had a special impact on the media. In one of them, with coordinated bicycle bells, the lecture visitors formed the world's largest bicycle bell orchestra for entry in the Guinness Book of World Records.

Jörg Kärger has been married to the dentist Birge Kärger, née Koch, since 1971. The marriage produced four children (Sebastian 1976, Wieland and Luise 1978 and Philipp 1981).

== Functions and memberships ==
- 1996 to 1999 Dean of the Faculty of Physics and Earth Sciences at the University of Leipzig,
- 1995 to 1998 Chairman of DECHEMA's subject division "Zeolites",
- 2002 to 2006 Ombudsman of the University of Leipzig
- 2007 to 2010 Member of the Board of Directors of the Center for Magnetic Resonance at the University of Leipzig.
- since 2000 member of the Saxon Academy of Sciences and Humanities in Leipzig (chairman of the structural commission "Propagation in Nature, Technology and Society").
- since 2018 head of the IUPAC working group "Diffusion in Nanoporous Solids".
- Member of the Protestant Research Academy since 2003.
- 1991 Founding member of the Promotion Circle of the Leipzig University Choir (Vice Chairman from 1991 to 2014).

== Publications ==
Books

- Jörg Kärger, Douglas Morris Ruthven: Diffusion in Zeolites and Other Microporous Solids. John Wiley, New York, USA (1992), ISBN 978-0-471-50907-3
- Paul Heitjans, Jörg Kärger (Hrsg.): Diffusion in Condensed Matter: Methods, Materials, Models. Springer, Berlin Heidelberg 2005, ISBN 978-3-540-72081-2
- Jörg Kärger (Hrsg.): Leipzig, Einstein, Diffusion. Leipziger Universitätsverlag, Leipzig, 2007, (3. Auflage 2014), ISBN 978-3-86583-176-7
- Jörg Kärger, Douglas Morris Ruthven, Doros N. Theodorou: Diffusion in Nanoporous Materials, Wiley-VCH, Weinheim 2012, ISBN 978-3-527-31024-1
- Armin Bunde, Jürgen Caro, Jörg Kärger, Gero Vogl (Hrsg.): Diffusive Spreading in Nature, Technology and Society. Springer International Publishing, Cham, 2018, ISBN 978-3-31967-797-2

Selected articles

- Kärger, J. (1969). "Zur Bestimmung der Diffusion in einem Zweibereichsystem mit Hilfe von gepulsten Feldgradienten". Annalen der Physik (in German). 479 (1–2). Wiley: 1–4. Bibcode:1969AnP...479....1K. doi:10.1002/andp.19694790102. ISSN 0003-3804.
- Kärger, Jörg; Caro, Jürgen (1977). "Interpretation and correlation of zeolitic diffusivities obtained from nuclear magnetic resonance and sorption experiments". Journal of the Chemical Society, Faraday Transactions 1: Physical Chemistry in Condensed Phases. 73. Royal Society of Chemistry (RSC): 1363. doi:10.1039/f19777301363. ISSN 0300-9599.
- Heink, W.; Kärger, J.; Pfeifer, H. (1978). "Application of zeugmatography to study kinetics of physical adsorption". Chemical Engineering Science. 33 (8). Elsevier BV: 1019–1023. Bibcode:1978ChEnS..33.1019H. doi:10.1016/0009-2509(78)85005-2. ISSN 0009-2509.
- Kärger, Jörg; Heink, Wilfried (1983). "The propagator representation of molecular transport in microporous crystallites". Journal of Magnetic Resonance. 51 (1). Elsevier BV: 1–7. Bibcode:1983JMagR..51....1K. doi:10.1016/0022-2364(83)90094-x. ISSN 0022-2364.
- Kukla, Volker; Kornatowski, Jan; Demuth, Dirk; Girnus, Irina; Pfeifer, Harry; Rees, Lovat V. C.; Schunk, Stefan; Unger, Klaus K.; Kärger, Jörg (3 May 1996). "NMR Studies of Single-File Diffusion in Unidimensional Channel Zeolites". Science. 272 (5262). American Association for the Advancement of Science (AAAS): 702–704. Bibcode:1996Sci...272..702K. doi:10.1126/science.272.5262.702. ISSN 0036-8075. PMID 8662563. S2CID 35544982.
- Valiullin, Rustem; Naumov, Sergej; Galvosas, Petrik; Kärger, Jörg; Woo, Hyung-June; Porcheron, Fabien; Monson, Peter A. (2006). "Exploration of molecular dynamics during transient sorption of fluids in mesoporous materials". Nature. 443 (7114). Springer Science and Business Media LLC: 965–968. Bibcode:2006Natur.443..965V. doi:10.1038/nature05183. ISSN 0028-0836. PMID 17066029. S2CID 4390425.
- Feil, Florian; Naumov, Sergej; Michaelis, Jens; Valiullin, Rustem; Enke, Dirk; Kärger, Jörg; Bräuchle, Christoph (18 October 2011). "Single-Particle and Ensemble Diffusivities-Test of Ergodicity". Angewandte Chemie International Edition. 51 (5). Wiley: 1152–1155. doi:10.1002/anie.201105388. ISSN 1433-7851. PMID 22006543.
- Kärger, Jörg; Binder, Tomas; Chmelik, Christian; Hibbe, Florian; Krautscheid, Harald; Krishna, Rajamani; Weitkamp, Jens (21 March 2014). "Microimaging of transient guest profiles to monitor mass transfer in nanoporous materials". Nature Materials. 13 (4). Springer Science and Business Media LLC: 333–343. Bibcode:2014NatMa..13..333K. doi:10.1038/nmat3917. ISSN 1476-1122. PMID 24651427.
- Chmelik, Christian; Liebau, Michael; Al-Naji, Majd; Möllmer, Jens; Enke, Dirk; Gläser, Roger; Kärger, Jörg (7 December 2018). "One-Shot Measurement of Effectiveness Factors of Chemical Conversion in Porous Catalysts". ChemCatChem. 10 (24). Wiley: 5602–5609. doi:10.1002/cctc.201801530. ISSN 1867-3880. S2CID 106126934.

== Sources ==
- Jörg Kärger in Kürschners Deutscher Gelehrten-Kalender 2018, Bd. 2. H–L, S. 1689
- Jürgen Caro: Jörg Kärger: Diffusion Is His Life. In: Chemie Ingenieur Technik. Volume 95, Issue 11, November 2023, Pages 1707–1712 (online)
