= Arthur Nozik =

American chemist

Arthur J. Nozik
- Born: January 10, 1936 (age 90); Springfield, Massachusetts
- Education: Cornell University (BChE); Yale University (MS, PhD)
- Known for: Photoelectrochemistry
- Scientific career
- Workplaces: Allied Chemical Corporation; American Cyanamid; University of Colorado at Boulder; National Renewable Energy Lab
- Thesis: Mössbauer resonance studies of ions in ice
- Doctoral advisor: Morton Kaplan
- Website: www.nrel.gov/research/staff/arthur-nozik.html www.colorado.edu/chemistry/arthur-nozik

Arthur J. Nozik (born 1936) is a researcher at the National Renewable Energy Lab (NREL). He is also a professor at the University of Colorado, which is located in Boulder. He researches semiconductor quantum dots at the National Renewable Energy Laboratory, and is a chemistry professor at the University of Colorado. He also does research for the advancement of solar energy, for which he won the Intergovernmental Renewable Energy Organization (IREO) Award for Science and Technology in 2009.

== Biography ==
Dr. Arthur Nozik received his bachelor's degree in Chemical Engineering from the Cornell University in 1959, and he earned his MS and PhD in Physical Chemistry from Yale University in 1967. In 1967, he discovered a new transparent conductor (Cd_{2}SnO_{4}) Thin-Film Devices, which helped develop new applications for solar energy devices. Then he did research on quantization effects in semiconductor quantum dots, for the Allied Chemical Corporation and the American Cyanamid Corporation. He then worked as a group leader of Photoelectrochemistry from 1974 to 1978. He worked in both these places until 1978, when he joined the National Renewable Energy Laboratory (NREL). He has published a little over 150 research papers related to solar cell, quantum dot, semiconductor, silicon solar cells. He has been an editor of the Journal of Physical Chemistry since 1993 and served as senior editor. He has reviewed numerous papers for various scientific magazines.

== Career and research ==
His research includes the following:

- The effects of size quantization on semiconductor nanocrystals
- The nanostructures of quantum dots, wells and how well they can convert solar photons
- Photoelectrochemistry (the study of light through electrochemical systems) of a semiconductor molecule, and their energy conversions
- Photocatalysis, which is the acceleration of a photoreaction, in the presence of a catalyst
- Magnetic and electrical properties of solids

== Bibliography ==
- Photoeffects at semiconductor-electrolyte interfaces : based on a symposium sponsored by the Division of Colloid and Surface Chemistry at the 179th meeting of the American Chemical Society, Houston, Texas, March 25-26, 1980. Arthur J. Nozik, American Chemical Society. Division of Colloid and Surface Chemistry, American Chemical Society. Meeting. Washington, D.C.: American Chemical Society. 1981. ISBN 0-8412-0604-X. OCLC 7169388.
- Miller, R. J. Dwayne; McLendon, George L.; Nozik, Arthur J.; Schmickler, Wolfgang; Willig, Frank (1995). Surface electron transfer processes. New York: VCH. ISBN 1-56081-036-X. OCLC 30809674.
- Nanostructured and photoelectrochemical systems for solar photon conversion. Mary D. Archer, Arthur J. Nozik. London: Imperial College Press. 2008. ISBN 978-1-60119-773-3. OCLC 320757573.
- Nozik, Arthur J; Conibeer, Gavin; Beard, Matthew C (2014). Advanced concepts in photovoltaics. Cambridge: Royal Society of Chemistry. ISBN 978-1-84973-591-9. OCLC 885247935.
- Nozik, Arthur J.; Conibeer, Gavin (2014). Advanced concepts in photovoltaics. Volume 2. Cambridge: Royal Society of Chemistry. ISBN 978-1-84973-590-2. OCLC 870426659.
- Ginsberg, Michael; Sachs, Jeffrey D; Nozik, Arthur J; Fthenakis, Vasilis M (2019). Harness it: renewable energy technologies and project development models transforming the grid. Business Expert Press. ISBN 978-1-63157-932-5. OCLC 1106364303.

== See also ==
- Solar cells
- Photovoltaic cells
- Quantum dots
- Nanostructures
- Electron transfer
- Renewable and Sustainable Energy Institute
