= Manfred Baerns =

German chemist (1934–2021)

Manfred Baerns (23 July 1934 – 2 February 2021) was a German chemist.

== Career ==
After a 2-years postdoctoral fellowship at the Argonne National Laboratory (Argonne, Illinois), a further 5 years in academia and a 5-year career in industry, was a full professor for chemical technology and reaction engineering at Ruhr-University Bochum (Germany) from 1974–1995. He then acted as scientific director of the "Institute of Applied Chemistry Berlin-Adlershof" until 2003. He was lately a guest scientist as Professor Emeritus at the "Fritz-Haber-Institute" of the Max-Planck-Society at Berlin.

Baerns was a member of numerous scientific committees and a referee for research proposal at a national level. From 1991 to 1997 he was member of the board DECHEMA (a scientific association of chemical technology, chemical engineering and biotechnology), and a permanent member of the German Chemical Society, the German Bunsen Society for Physical Chemistry, German Society for Coal, Oil and Gas, and finally the American Chemical Society.

He received the DECHEMA titanium medal, the award of the 4th World Congress on Oxidation Catalysis, for which he acted as president, honorary professorships of the Humboldt University and the Technical University, both at Berlin, honorary membership of the Leibniz-Institute for Catalysis at Rostock (Germany).

Baerns was an author of about 300 scientific publications and three books on chemical reaction engineering and catalysis. His research focused on heterogeneous catalysis (oil and gas for chemicals) and chemical reaction engineering.

He died in February 2021 at the age of 86.

== Books ==
- Manfred Baerns, ed. (2004). Basic Principles in Applied Catalysis (Springer Series in Chemical Physics). Heidelberg, New York: Springer. ISBN 978-3-540-40261-9.
- Manfred Baerns; Hanns Hofmann; Albert Renken (1992). Chemische Reaktionstechnik. Stuttgart, New York: Thieme-Verlag.
- Manfred Baerns; Arno Behr; Axel Brehm; Jürgen Gmehling; Hanns Hofmann (2006). Technische Chemie (Industrial Chemistry), Textbook. Weinheim: Wiley-VCH.
- Manfred Baerns, Martin Holena, Combinatorial development of solid catalytic materials - Design of high throughput experiments, data analysis, data mining, 2009, Imperial College Press, London, 178 pages
