= Marie-Hélène Verlhac =

French cellular biologist

- Citizenship: France
- Education: Pierre and Marie Curie University, University of California, San Francisco
- Known for: Oocyte mechanics and morphogenesis
- Awards: CNRS Silver Medal
- Scientific career
- Fields: cellular biology
- Workplaces: Collège de France Center for Interdisciplinary Research in Biology (CIRB)
- Thesis: (1995)
- Doctoral advisor: Bernard Maro
- Website: https://www.college-de-france.fr/site/en-cirb/Terret-Verlhac.htm

Marie-Hélène Verlhac is a French cellular biologist, specialising in the final stages of oocyte development. She was the recipient of the French National Centre for Scientific Research's (CNRS) Silver Medal in 2021.

Verlhac has been the director of the Center for Interdisciplinary Research in Biology (CIRB) (French: Centre interdisciplinaire de recherche en biologie) since 2019, and the president of the French Society for Cell Biology (SBCF).

== Life and career ==
In 1988, Verlhac began her studies at the Ecole Normale Supérieure de Lyon. She graduated from Université Pierre et Marie Curie (UPMC) with a Master in Cellular and Developmental Biology in 1991, followed by a PhD in cellular and molecular biology in 1995, under the supervision of Dr. Bernard Maro. Her PhD studies also included a year studying under Prof. Hugh Clarke at McGill University. She undertook postdoctoral studies with Rik Derynck at the University of California, San Francisco.

Verlhac returned to France and became a principal investigator of her own lab in 2002, which researches oocyte mechanics and morphogenesis. Oocytes, the female gametes, divide asymmetrically so that maternal stores can be preserved for the embryo's development; Verlhac's lab uses genetics, two-hybrid screening, and live imaging combined with biophysics to study such divisions. In particular, her lab has discovered the mechanisms underlying the positioning of the nucleus and spindle in oocytes.

Verlhac was appointed deputy director of the CIRB in 2013, and then Director in 2019.

== Awards and honours ==
- The Royal Academy of Science, Letters and Fine Arts of Belgium's Albert Brachet Prize for embryology (2018)
- Member of the European Molecular Biology Organization (EMBO) (2018)
- CNRS Silver Medal (2021)
