= Emilio Picasso =

Italian physicist (1927–2014)

Emilio Picasso (9 July 1927, in Genoa – 12 October 2014) was an Italian physicist. For most of his career, he served as a researcher at CERN and was project leader for the Large Electron-Positron Collider (LEP), one of the largest particle accelerators ever constructed. Picasso was awarded the Legion of Honour from France and is also bearer of the Knight Grand Cross of the Italian Republic, Italy's highest civilian honor. When he died, his hometown newspaper called it a moment of mourning for "the international scientific community and for Pisa."

== Life and career ==
Picasso studied first mathematics and then two years physics at the University of Genoa. After his doctorate, he started working there as an assistance professor for experimental physics. At the beginning he kept himself busy with atom physics, but then his interests changed to elementary particle physics. Therefore, he worked at the Betatron in Turin and then at the Synchrotron in Frascati. In the years 1961/62 he worked in a group led by Cecil Powell, which researched cosmic rays with balloons.

Two years later in 1964 he joined CERN for researching the anomalous magnetic moment of muons, which was a precision test for the quantum electrodynamics. The so-called g minus 2 experiment was an idea of Leon Lederman. Picasso worked in a collaboration with physicists John Bailey, Francis Farley, Simon van der Meer, Guido Petrucci and Frank Krienen. At this experiment a 10 GeV beam of protons is ejected by the Proton Synchrotron. This beam is headed on target inside one of the Muon Storage rings, which were built for this experiment. There 70% of the protons interact with each other producing a burst of particles, among other things many negative pions. The pions, which have the right momentum (about 1,3 GeV/c), turn in the magnetic field so that they can orbit the ring. There the pions decay rather quickly, in the first turn around one fifth of them change to negative muons. Some of these muons which are emitted at small angles to the direction of the pions have slightly lower momentum than the pions and therefore move to an orbit of smaller radius. So they miss the target at the end of the first turn and are kept orbiting in the magnet ring. The measurement needed 15 years and at the end, they calculated the g-factor and the magnetic momentum of a muon.

After that Picasso was concerned with the design of a superconducting gravitational-wave detector. In the year 1980 the director-general Herwig Schopper announced him to be the project leader of the LEP at the CERN. Here he could use his knowledge about superconductors. At the beginning they planned a bigger ring, which should go 12 km under the Jura Mountains. But because of the high water pressure, the tunnel expert Giovanni Lombardi disadvised from this layer, so they reduced the way under the Jura Mountains and the collaboration transferred the ring. But also 3 km under the mountains was difficult to build and "the mountains answered" (Picasso), water broke in and they had to reduce the length of the tunnel, because it was not possible to build under the mountains. At the 14 July 1989 the LEP was brought on line like Picasso promised president Jacques Chirac two years ago. In the year 1992, he resigned at CERN and became director at the Scuola Normale Superiore in Pisa, where he continued in collaboration with the University of Genoa his researches about gravitational-wave detector.

== Awards ==
Picasso was a member of the Académie des sciences and the Accademia Nazionale delle Scienze. Furthermore, he was bearer of the Legion of Honour and bearer of the Knight Grand Cross of the Italian Republic.

== Sources ==
- Andrew Sessler, Edmund Wilson: Engines of discovery. World Scientific, 2007.
- Francis Farley, Emilio Picasso: The Muon g-2 Experiment. In: T. Kinoshita (Hrsg.): Quantum Electrodynamics. World Scientific, 1990, S. 479–559.
- Francis Farley, Emilio Picasso: The Muon g-2 Experiments. In: Annual Review Nuclear and Particle Science. Band 29, 1979, S. 243–282.
