= Marie-Hélène Mathey Boo =

Ambassador of the DRC to the United States

Her Excellency Marie-Hélène Mathey Boo Lowumba
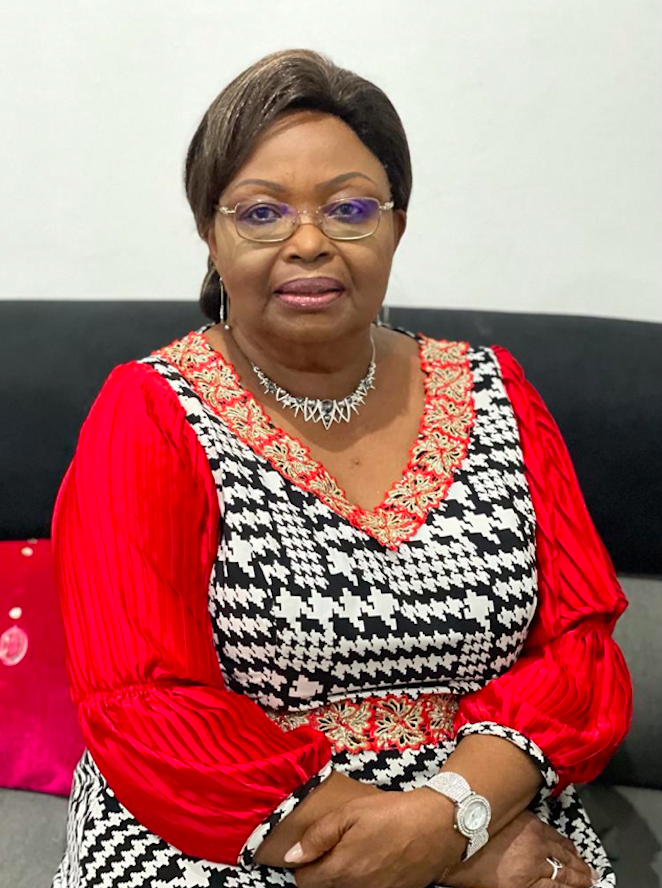
- Born: November 30, 1943 (age 82); Kinshasa, Democratic Republic of Congo
- Occupations: Ambassador; Diplomat; Consultant
- Title: Ambassador of the Democratic Republic of Congo to the United States
- Predecessor: Ambassador François Nkuna Balumuene
- Awards: Medal of the Commandeur de L'Étoile Équatoriale du Gabon.

Marie-Hélène Mathey Boo Lowumba (born November 30, 1943) was named ambassador of the Democratic Republic of Congo to the United States on January 11, 2022, by Congolese President Félix Tshisekedi. She is preceded by Ambassador François Nkuna Balumuene. Prior to her appointment, she served as Ambassador of the Republic of Congo to Gabon, Minister of Industry, Commerce, and Weights & Measures in the Democratic Republic of Congo, and Director of External Relations and Governance of the World Health Organization (WHO) among other positions. As a descendant of Koko Mwato I, Marie-Hélène Mathey Boo is the 12th Chief of Bokoli (Ngemoboku Clan) in the Democratic Republic of Congo's Mai-Ndombe Province.

== Early life and education ==
Marie-Hélène Mathey Boo was born in Kinshasa to Marie Mpisomi Yamba and Reverend Pierre Boo Nsuba Lokwankosi. Through the International Christian Youth Exchange, she received her High School Diploma at Woodside High School in California and later studied sociology at Beaver College (now Arcadia University) in Glenside, Pennsylvania. At the Free University of Brussels in Belgium (ULB), Marie-Hélène Mathey Boo earned her doctorate in law with a focus in international law, marking the beginning of a career in diplomacy and advising. It is here that she met her late husband René Mathey, who hailed from the neighboring and sister Republic of Congo.

== Career ==
Through her long diplomatic career in the Democratic Republic of Congo, the Republic of Congo, Nigeria, and Gabon, Marie-Hélène Mathey Boo has served in an array of fields, including bilateral and multilateral diplomacy, jurisdiction, economics, resource mobilization, international relations, and community development.

Having completed their studies in Belgium, Marie-Hélène Mathey Boo and her husband René Mathey moved to Brazzaville, launching her career in diplomacy. From 1972 to 1973, Marie-Hélène Mathey Boo was Advisor to the Minister of Foreign Affairs in the Republic of Congo. In that capacity, she negotiated new cooperation agreements and Law of the Sea agreements between France and the Republic of Congo. Between 1973 and 1975, she would work in several other positions in the Republic of Congo, including diplomat and judicial advisor to the presidential cabinet, economic advisor to the embassy, and professor of International Law and Diplomacy at The National University of Administration in Brazzaville.

In 1977, Marie-Hélène Mathey Boo worked as Chief Administrator for the Center for Industrial Development in Brussels. During this tenure, she actively participated in preparing Africa's first industrial forum. In Gabon, she founded the Institut Sous-Régional de Technologie Appliquée, while in Nigeria, she served as Country Director for the United Nations Industrial Development Organization (UNIDO).

As Minister of Trade, Medium and Small-Scale Enterprises, and Crafts beginning in April 2001, she worked to expand infrastructure and promote investment. Marie-Hélène Mathey Boo was named ambassador of the Democratic Republic of Congo to the Republic of Gabon, and served a two-year term from 2003 to 2005. For her extensive service in the Republic of Gabon, she was awarded the nation's Medal of the Commandeur de L'Étoile Équatoriale. Marie-Hélène Mathey Boo also served as the executive director of the Centre International des Civilisations Bantu (CICIBA) from 2005 to 2009. From 2010 to 2021, she worked as a senior consultant in the private sectors of law, mediation, and resource mobilization.

On January 11, 2022, Marie-Hélène Mathey Boo was appointed ambassador to the United States for the Democratic Republic of Congo, succeeding Ambassador François Nkuna Balumuene.
