= Philippe Ciais =

Philippe Ciais is a researcher of the Laboratoire des Sciences du Climat et de l'Environnement (LSCE), the climate change research unit of the Institut Pierre Simon Laplace (IPSL). He is a physicist working on the global carbon cycle of planet Earth, climate change, ecology and geosciences.

== Professional career ==
Philippe Ciais studied physics at École normale supérieure and received a PhD in 1991 entitled “Holocene climate record of Antarctic ice cores”.

In 1992 he was a post-doctoral fellow at National Oceanic and Atmospheric Administration (NOAA) in Boulder, Colorado, U.S. and investigated how carbon and oxygen isotopes in atmospheric CO_{2} can be used to constrain terrestrial carbon fluxes. He also designed the first three-dimensional simulation model of the heavy oxygen isotope in CO_{2}, an isotopic tracer of the water cycle coupled with carbon dioxide uptake by plant photosynthesis.

After 1994, Philippe Ciais returned to France at LSCE and carried out research into the inverse modeling of CO_{2} and CH_{4} fluxes at the surface of the Earth, based on transport models and a global network of surface in-situ stations. Under his leadership, this activity has been developed at LSCE into a research team. In parallel, Philippe Ciais led the establishment of the French greenhouse gas atmospheric monitoring network, going from two stations in 1992 to 25 stations today, and became a key component of the Integrated Carbon Observation System (ICOS) large-scale European research infrastructure.

Philippe Ciais continued research during the last twenty years, mainly on the relationships between ecosystem CO_{2} fluxes and climate, combining terrestrial biosphere models with satellite and eddy-covariance observations. He took part in the set up and interpretation of one of the first coupled carbon-climate simulation with the IPSL climate model, and pioneered the incorporation of cultivated ecosystems into a terrestrial biosphere model.

Philippe Ciais has been scientific coordinator or principal investigator of French, European Union and International projects and became co-chair of the Global Carbon Project in 2009. He had the opportunity to contribute to several synthesis of recent trends in the carbon cycle, characterized by the recent fast growth of emissions and by a slowing trend of natural sinks, a finding that had a large impact in the media.

He acted as co-chair of the Global Carbon Observation Strategy of the Group on Earth Observation (GEO) task force on integrated carbon observations.

He has worked for the IPCC in the Fourth IPCC Assessment Report, which was awarded the 2007 Nobel Peace Prize, and coordinated the Chapter 6 "Carbon and other biogeochemical cycles" in the IPCC Fifth Assessment Report.

He is one of the principal investigators of the ERC-Synergy 2014-2019 grant IMBALANCE-P project, dealing with phosphorus and nitrogen imbalance of organisms, ecosystems and the earth system.

A collaboration with Beijing University has been maintained with the SINO-FRENCH SOFIE Research Institute for Earth System Science led by Shilong Piao and Philippe Ciais.

In June 2026, he was prominently featured in a wide-ranging Carbon Brief Cosmos profile and interview, which confirmed him as the world's most highly cited climate scientist. He has more than 1,300 peer-reviewed studies. In the feature, he voiced deep concerns over sudden, unmodeled ecosystem collapses—like tree mortality from severe droughts—and warned about the future stability of Earth's natural carbon sinks.

== Publications ==
Philippe Ciais is a highly cited researcher in two fields: Geosciences and Environment/Ecology and in all the fields of the ISI science indicators (Thomson Reuters). He has ranked as the most productive scientific author in the field of climate change, and among the authors who contributed to 5 of the 100 most influential papers in this field in a recent CarbonBrief analysis (2015) and was ranked among the list of Highly Cited Researchers in Clarivate Analytics.

He has published more than 650 scientific papers and contributed to the dissemination of science activities at national and international level including:

- Ciais, Philippe (March 1999). "Restless carbon pools". Nature. 398 (6723): 111–112. doi:10.1038/18124. S2CID 5590627.
- Ciais, Ph.; Reichstein, M.; Viovy, N.; Granier, A.; Ogée, J.; Allard, V.; Aubinet, M.; Buchmann, N.; Bernhofer, Chr.; Carrara, A.; Chevallier, F.; De Noblet, N.; Friend, A. D.; Friedlingstein, P.; Grünwald, T.; Heinesch, B.; Keronen, P.; Knohl, A.; Krinner, G.; Loustau, D.; Manca, G.; Matteucci, G.; Miglietta, F.; Ourcival, J. M.; Papale, D.; Pilegaard, K.; Rambal, S.; Seufert, G.; Soussana, J. F.; Sanz, M. J.; Schulze, E. D.; Vesala, T.; Valentini, R. (September 2005). "Europe-wide reduction in primary productivity caused by the heat and drought in 2003". Nature. 437 (7058): 529–533. Bibcode:2005Natur.437..529C. doi:10.1038/nature03972. PMID 16177786. S2CID 4426569.
- Ciais, P.; Schelhaas, M. J.; Zaehle, S.; Piao, S. L.; Cescatti, A.; Liski, J.; Luyssaert, S.; Le-Maire, G.; Schulze, E.-D.; Bouriaud, O.; Freibauer, A.; Valentini, R.; Nabuurs, G. J. (22 June 2008). "Carbon accumulation in European forests". Nature Geoscience. 1 (7): 425–429. Bibcode:2008NatGe...1..425C. doi:10.1038/ngeo233.
- Ciais, Philippe (November 2009). "Journal club". Nature. 462 (7272): 393. Bibcode:2009Natur.462..393C. doi:10.1038/462393e. PMID 19940879. S2CID 30279842.
- Ciais, Philippe (1 September 2010). "Soil map digs under the tundra". Nature. 467 (7311): 30–31. Bibcode:2010Natur.467...30C. doi:10.1038/467030a.
- Ciais, P.; Tagliabue, A.; Cuntz, M.; Bopp, L.; Scholze, M.; Hoffmann, G.; Lourantou, A.; Harrison, S. P.; Prentice, I. C.; Kelley, D. I.; Koven, C.; Piao, S. L. (20 November 2011). "Large inert carbon pool in the terrestrial biosphere during the Last Glacial Maximum". Nature Geoscience. 5 (1): 74–79. doi:10.1038/ngeo1324.
- Ciais, P.; Gasser, T.; Paris, J. D.; Caldeira, K.; Raupach, M. R.; Canadell, J. G.; Patwardhan, A.; Friedlingstein, P.; Piao, S. L.; Gitz, V. (14 July 2013). "Attributing the increase in atmospheric CO2 to emitters and absorbers". Nature Climate Change. 3 (10): 926–930. Bibcode:2013NatCC...3..926C. doi:10.1038/nclimate1942.
- Ciais, P.; Tans, P. P.; Trolier, M.; White, J. W. C.; Francey, R. J. (25 August 1995). "A Large Northern Hemisphere Terrestrial CO2 Sink Indicated by the 13C/12C Ratio of Atmospheric CO2". Science. 269 (5227): 1098–1102. Bibcode:1995Sci...269.1098C. doi:10.1126/science.269.5227.1098. PMID 17755534. S2CID 20920937.

== Awards and honors ==
He has received several awards-prizes both national and international.

- In 2013, the Award Stars of Europe from the French Ministry of Research and Higher Education Etoiles de l’Europe.
- In 2016, the European Copernicus Medal from the Copernicus Gesellschaft that recognizes ingenious, innovative work in the geosciences or in the planetary and space sciences.
- In 2017, the Silver Medal of the Centre National de la Recherche Scientifique (CNRS) for his research on the quantification and understanding of greenhouse gas fluxes.
- In 2019 elected member of the French Academy of sciences.
