= CNRS Silver Medal =

French scientific award

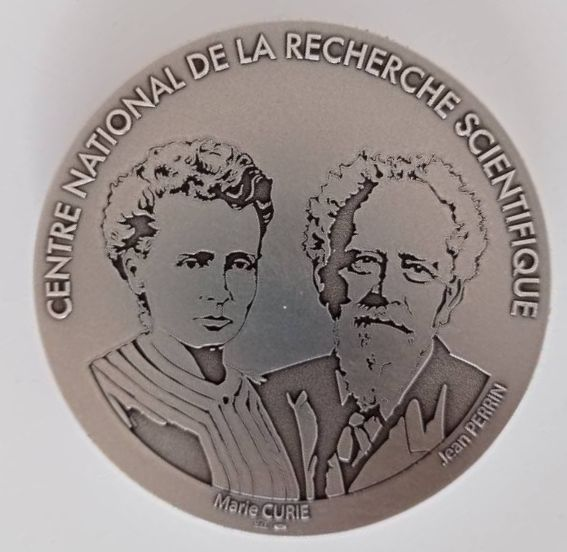
- Reverse side of the CNRS silver medal awarded to scientist Michel Grossetti in 2023, showing image of Marie Curie and Jean Perrin
- Awarded for: The originality, quality and importance of a researcher's work
- Sponsored by: French National Centre for Scientific Research (CNRS)
- Country: France
- Website: https://www.cnrs.fr/fr/talents/cnrs?medal=39

The CNRS Silver Medal is a scientific award given every year to about fifteen researchers by the French National Centre for Scientific Research (CNRS). It is awarded to a researcher for "the originality, quality and importance of their work, recognised on a national and international level".

It is part of the "CNRS Talents" medals, along with the CNRS gold medal, which rewards a whole scientific career, the CNRS bronze medal, which rewards young researchers, the Innovation medal, which honours remarkable work in the technological, therapeutic, economic or societal fields, and the CNRS Crystal medal, which rewards research support staff.

== Notable recipients ==
- Gabriel Peyré (mathematics) (2021)
- Marie-Hélène Verlhac (biology) (2021)
- Claire Mathieu (computer science) (2019)
- Margaret Maruani (sociology) (2014)
- Marie-Françoise André (2011)
- Anca Muscholl (mathematics) (2010)
- Edith Heard (biology) (2008)
- Anne Abeillé (linguistics) (2007)
- Marc Fontecave (2004)
- Leanne Pitchford (physics) (1999)
- Pascale Delecluse (physics) (1999)
- Guy Joulin (1996)
