= Jin-ho =

- Hangul: 진호
- RR: Jinho
- MR: Chinho

Jin-ho, also spelled Chin-ho, is a Korean given name. Jin-ho was the eighth-most popular name for baby boys in South Korea in 1960, not in the top ten in 1970, and rose back to seventh place by 1980.

== Entertainers ==
- Choi Jin-ho (actor) (born 1968), South Korean actor
- Kim Jin-ho (singer) (born 1986), South Korean male singer
- Jinho (born Jo Jin-ho, 1992), South Korean singer, member of boy band Pentagon

== Sportspeople ==
- Kim Jin-ho (archer) (born 1961), South Korean female archer
- Cho Jin-ho (footballer) (1973–2017), South Korean male football midfielder
- Cho Jin-ho (baseball) (born 1975), South Korean male baseball pitcher
- Lee Jin-ho (born 1984), South Korean male football forward
- Jung Jin-ho (born 1986), South Korean male handball player
- Jung Jin-ho (baseball) (born 1988), South Korean male baseball outfielder
- Sin Jin-ho (born 1988), South Korean male football midfielder
- Choi Jin-ho (footballer) (born 1989), South Korean football player
- Jeong Jin-ho (born 1996), South Korean male football midfielder

== Others ==
- Choy Jin-ho (born 1948), South Korean male chemist
- Hur Jin-ho (born 1963), South Korean male film director
- Hong Jin-ho (born 1982), South Korean male professional StarCraft player

== See also ==
- List of Korean given names
