= Choy Jin-ho =

South Korean chemist (born 1948)

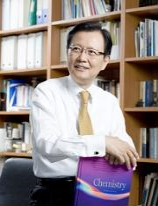
- Born: September 1, 1948 (age 77); Seoul, South Korea
- Education: Yonsei University, Tokyo Institute of Technology, LMU Munich
- Known for: Inorganic chemistry, two-dimensional nanohybrids via intercalation chemistry, bio-inorganic functional hybrid nano materials
- Scientific career
- Fields: Chemistry
- Workplaces: Center for Intelligent Nano-Bio Materials, Department of Chemistry and Nano Science, Ewha Womans University
- Doctoral students: Nam-Gyu Park

Korean name
- Hangul: 최진호
- Hanja: 崔珍鎬
- RR: Choe Jinho
- MR: Ch'oe Chinho

Choy Jin-ho (Korean: 최진호; born September 1, 1948) is a South Korean scientist. He was a professor in the department of chemistry at Seoul National University from 1981 to 2004, and thereafter a distinguished professor and director of the Center for Intelligent Nano-Bio Materials (CINBM) at Ewha Womans University.

== Education ==
Choy received his B.S. (1971) and M.S. degrees (1973) in chemical engineering from Yonsei University in Seoul. Afterwards, he received a diploma in 1975 from the UNESCO postgraduate course in chemistry and chemical engineering, research laboratory of engineering materials, Tokyo Institute of Technology, Japan. He then moved to Germany, where he earned his PhD (1979) in inorganic chemistry at LMU Munich.

== Work ==
Choy was a professor in the department of chemistry at Seoul National University (1981–2004). He is currently a distinguished professor and director of the Center for Intelligent Nano-Bio Materials (CINBM) at Ewha Womans University. He held multiple visiting professorships:

- Laboratoire de Chimie du Solide du CNRS, Universite de Bordeaux I, France (1985–1986),
- Department of materials engineering, University of Illinois at Urbana Champaign, United States (2003),
- Kumamoto University, Japan (2008)
- Honorary professor of Australian Institute for Bioengineering and Nanotechnology at The University of Queensland, Australia.

He was a member of the international editorial board (IEB) or an associate editor of the Journal of Material Chemistry, Materials Research Bulletin, and Chemistry of Materials, and is currently involved in various journals including Journal of Solid State Chemistry, Solid State Sciences, Chemistry – An Asian Journal as an IEB member.

== Awards ==
- Korean Chemical Society (1997),
- National science award in chemistry from the South Korean government (2000),
- Distinguished Service Knight Medal from the French Government (Palmes Academiques Chevalier dans l'Ordre des Palmes Academiques: 2003)
- 1st Class National Science Medal (2006)
- Korean Best Scientist Award from the President of South Korea (2007)
- Role Model in Science from the South Korean government
- Award of Fellow from the Royal Society of Chemistry, UK (2008)
- Culture award in science from Seoul City (2010)
- Academic award from Ewha Womans University (2012).
- Permanent member of Korean Academy of Science and Technology (2002).
