= Saxon Academy of Sciences and Humanities =

Saxon Academy of Sciences and Humanities in Leipzig
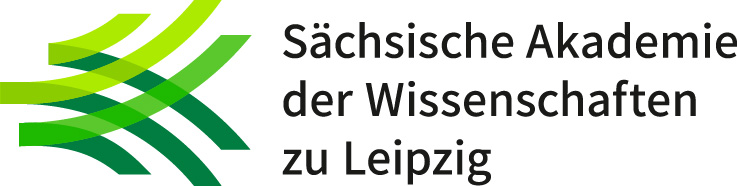

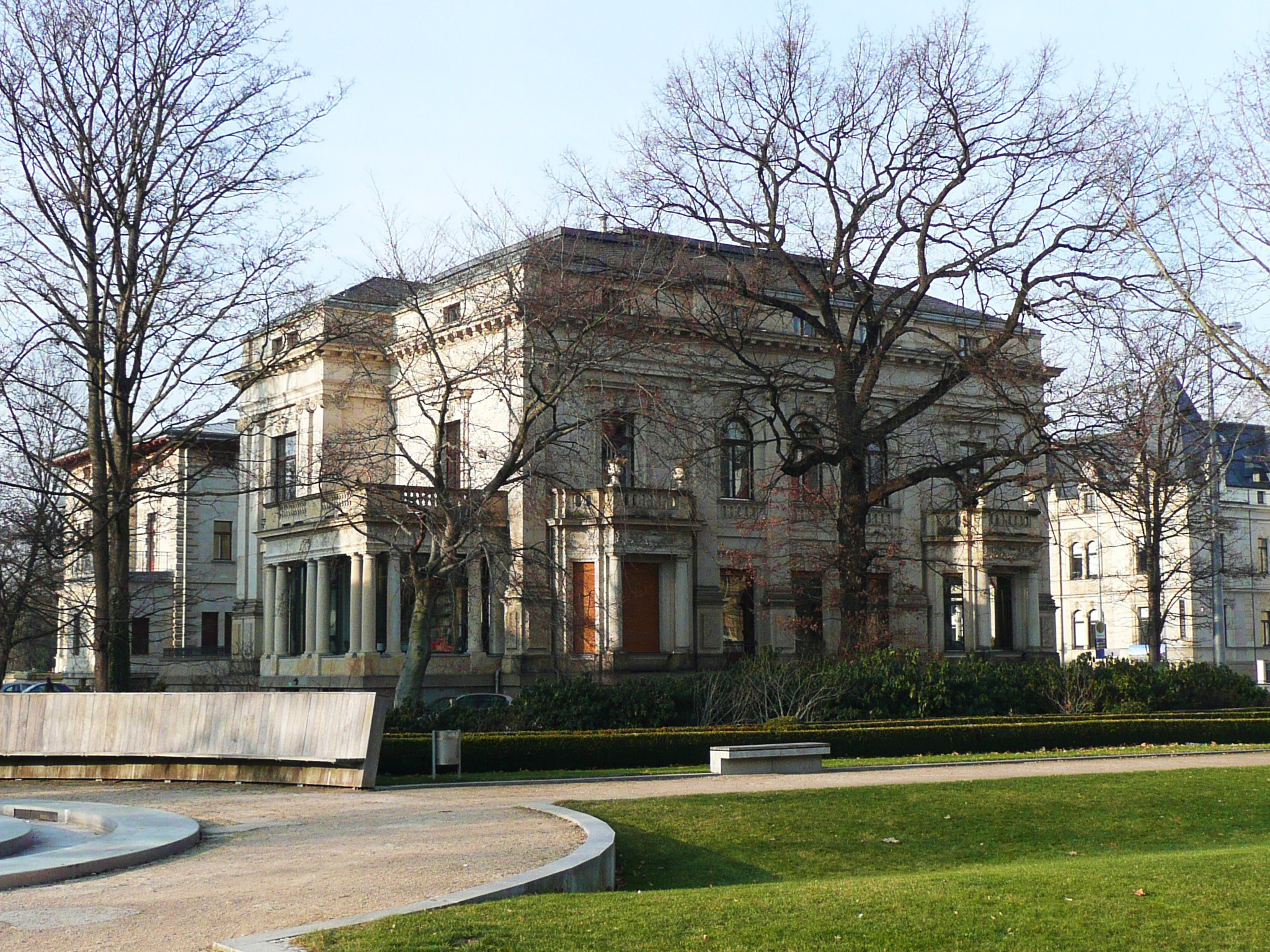
- Abbreviation: SAW
- Established: 1846
- Legal status: treaty
- Headquarters: Karl-Tauchnitz-Straße 1
- Location: Leipzig, Germany
- Coordinates: 51.3347°N 12.3694°E
- Official language: German
- President: Hans-Joachim Knölker
- Parent organization: Union of German Academies of Sciences and Humanities
- Website: saw-leipzig.de

The Saxon Academy of Sciences and Humanities in Leipzig (German: Sächsische Akademie der Wissenschaften zu Leipzig) is an institute which was founded in 1846 under the name Royal Saxon Society for the Sciences (German: Königlich Sächsische Gesellschaft der Wissenschaften). It has its headquarters in a villa in Leipzigs Musikviertel neighbourhood.

== Notable people ==
- Kurt Aland
- Annette Beck-Sickinger
- Walther Bothe
- Alexander Cartellieri
- James Chadwick
- Bernard Comrie
- Peter Debye
- Werner Heisenberg
- Gustav Hertz
- Archibald Vivian Hill
- Cuno Hoffmeister
- Elisabeth Karg-Gasterstädt
- Jörg Kärger
- Hermann Kolbe
- August Krogh
- Ursula Lehr
- Theodor Mommsen
- August Ferdinand Möbius
- Karl Alexander Müller
- Albrecht Neubert
- Wilhelm Ostwald
- Max Planck
- Gertrud Schubart-Fikentscher
- Carl Friedrich von Weizsäcker
- Paula Hertwig (1889–1983), German biologist, politician
- Max Planck (1858–1947), German physicist
- Otto Vossler (1902−1987), historian
