= GreatCell Solar =

Former solar energy company

GreatCell Solar Limited (ASX: GSL), previously known as Dyesol, was a solar energy company developing perovskite solar cell 3rd generation thin-film solar cell technologies and materials. The company was previously focused on developing dye-sensitized solar cell (DSC or DSSC) technology before shifting focus to perovskite solar cells, and had been since assisting manufacturing partners with the production of perovskite photovoltaic modules. The company was based in Queanbeyan, Australia and opened its manufacturing and research facilities in October 2008. It had expanded to several locations around the world, including the UK and Switzerland, and established joint ventures in South Korea and Singapore.

The company was predominantly focused on perovskite solar cell and materials development, with numerous academic and corporate partnerships attempting to commercialize modules based on both glass and metal substrates by 2019 and 2020 respectively. In July 2017, a memorandum of understanding was signed with the world's largest solar panel manufacturer, Jinko Solar, a decision made in hopes of allowing for large-scale deployment of the technology. In October 2018, the Materials Division of Greatcell Solar was branched off into a new business, Greatcell Solar Materials (GSM), now based in Queanbeyan.

In December 2018, GreatCell Solar Limited entered administration and was put into liquidation in September 2019.

Greatcell Solar Materials still operates as a manufacturer and supplier of materials (including perovskite precursors, dyes and titania pastes) for renewable energy systems in cooperation with the photovoltaics research sector and the wider electronics industry.

== DSC development and company history ==
Dye-sensitized solar cell technology was invented at the Institute of Physical Chemistry, Swiss Federal Institute of Technology in Lausanne, Switzerland in 1988 by Brian O'Regan and Michael Grätzel. Their paper, "A low-cost, high-efficiency solar cell based on dye-sensitized colloidal TiO_{2} films", was published in 1991 in the journal Nature, and spawned a new research field to harvest electrical power from sunlight. Since that time, Michael Grätzel, now at Switzerland's École Polytechnique Fédérale de Lausanne (EPFL), has received numerous awards and accolades in relation to the invention of DSCs, and maintained close links to Dyesol as Chairman of Dyesol's Technical Advisory Board.

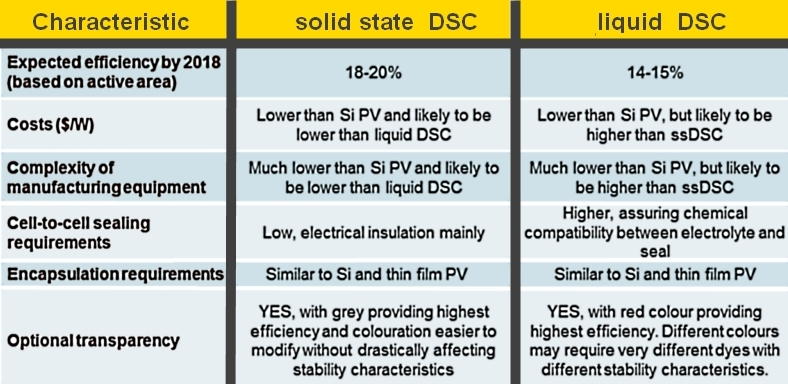
Major differences between DSC & ss-DSC

From 1994, STI and Greatcell teams in Australia and Switzerland developed DSC technology and established the world's first DSC prototype manufacturing facility in Australia in 2000. Key to that development phase was the invention of processes, new materials, and equipment to manufacture DSC products. Dyesol acquired the laboratory, manufacturing equipment and intellectual property which has resulted in a large portfolio of patents. Dyesol further acquired STI in 2006 and Greatcell in 2007.

Dyesol Limited was formed in 2004 to accelerate the commercial development of DSC technology and build on the DSC work of previous 14 years carried out by Sustainable Technologies International Pty Ltd ("STI"), Greatcell Solar S.A. ("Greatcell"), and Switzerland's École Polytechnique Fédérale de Lausanne (EPFL). It was listed on the Australian Stock Exchange in 2005 (DYE) and the German Open Market (D5I.F), and is trading on the OTCQX (DYSOY) through its depositary BNY Mellon.

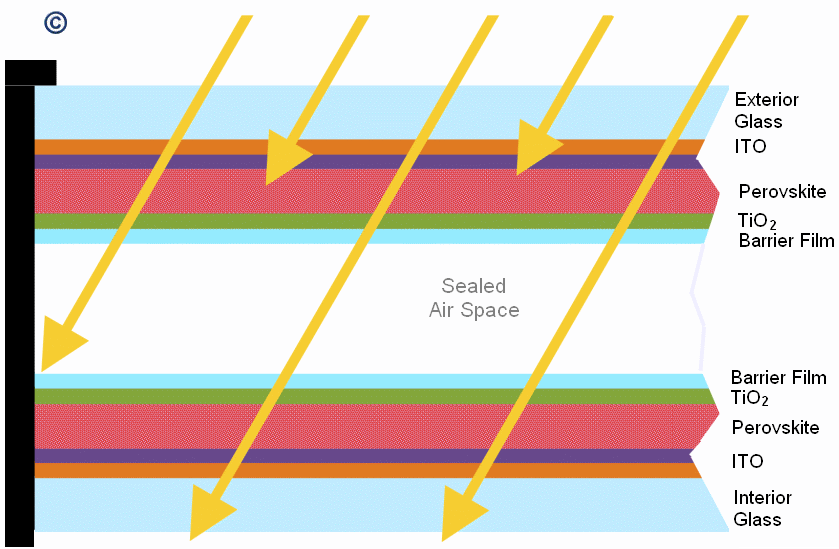
Transparent Tandem DSC on Glass

In May 2013 Dyesol announced that Dye-sensitized Solar Cell (DSC) technology has achieved a technical breakthrough by achieving a solid-state DSC (ss-DSC) efficiency of 11.3% at full sun. The technology is particularly important in solar markets where light conditions are sub-optimal, such as Europe, North America and North-East Asia, or low-light conditions (such as indoor applications) where much higher efficiencies over 30% can be achieved.

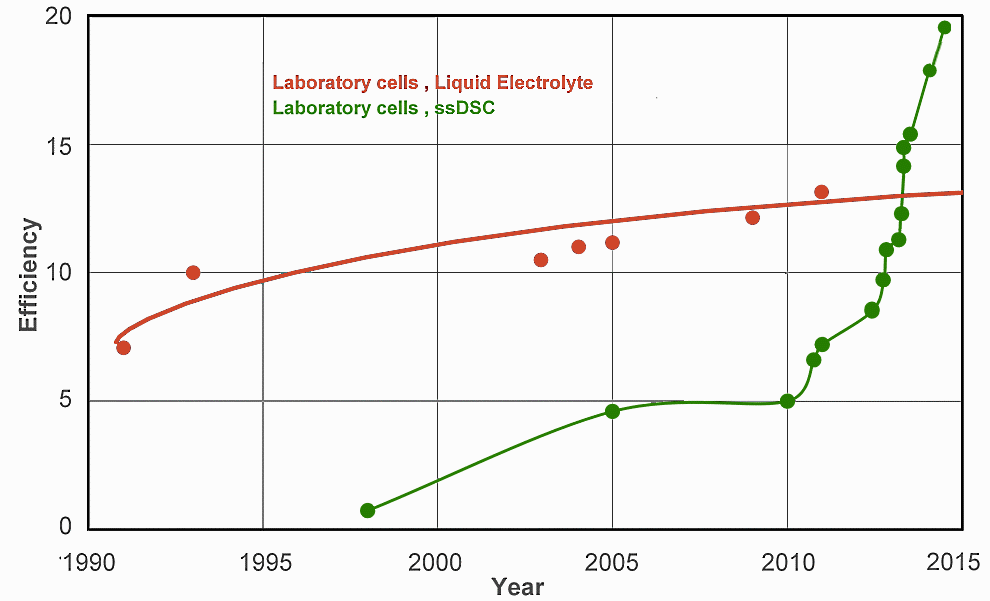
Solid State DSC efficiency against Liquid DSC

On July 11, 2013, Dyesol /EPFL announced a new record DSC efficiency. Michael Grätzel stated "Our research work on solid-state Dye Solar Cells (ss-DSC) is now achieving efficiencies exceeding 15%". However, this is now considered a perovskite solar cell and the official accredited DSC solar cell efficiency is 11.9% determined by the National Renewable Energy Laboratory. This efficiency is not expected to greatly increase as the DSC field has largely shifted to the development of perovskite solar cells which have achieved certified efficiencies over 23%.

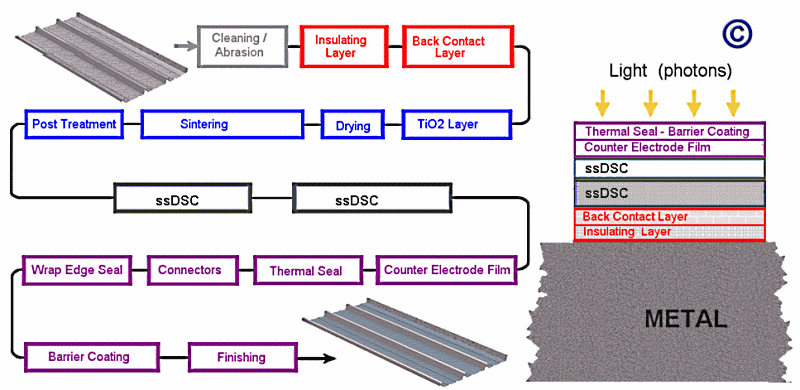
Dyesol ssDSC on Steel (Solar Steel)

== Subsidiaries and Partnerships ==
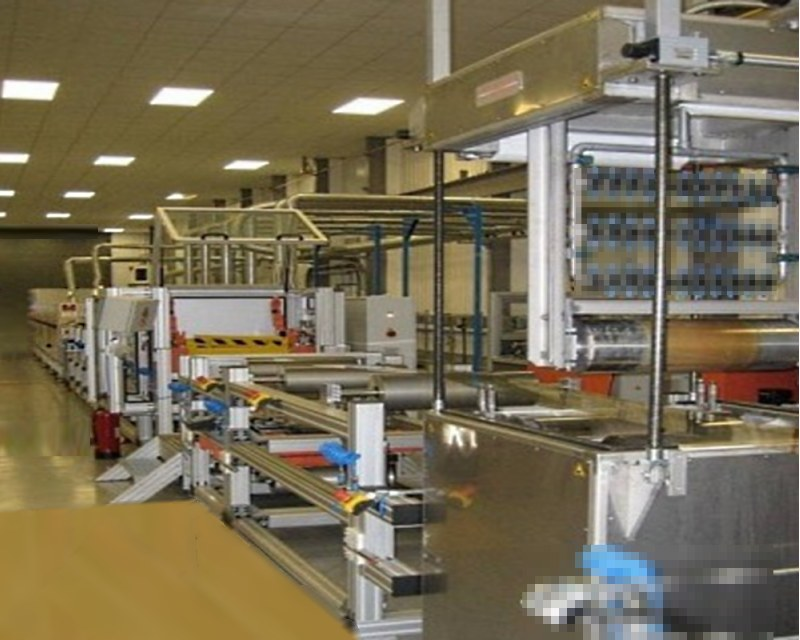
PV Accelerator Pilot Line 2

Subsidiaries

- Dyesol-Timo Co Ltd (ssDSC & Liquid DSC on Glass / Polymers / Steel), South Korea
- Dyesol Automotive Bavaria GmbH (ssDSC & Liquid DSC for Automotive), Germany
- Dyesol-Printed Power Pte Ltd (Research into Combined Energy Generation and Storage (CEGS)), Singapore

Academic and R&D Partners

- EPFL On going research mainly into Solid State DSC (ssDSC), Switzerland
- Nanyang Technological University Research into Solid State DSC (ssDSC), Singapore
- CSIRO Research into Solid State DSC (ssDSC), Australia
- Australian Nuclear Science and Technology Organisation ANSTO, Australia
- Bangor University
- University of Sheffield
- University of Manchester
- Swansea University
- SPECIFIC Wales
  - AkzoNobel Performance Coatings
  - TATA Steel Europe Colorcoat Steel Roofing & Siding
  - BASF Chemicles
  - Alcro-Beckers AB Paint
  - Nippon Sheet Glass Glass
  - EPSRC
  - Innovate UK

Commercial Partners

- Merck KGaA (Supplying electrolytes, ionic liquids)
- Sigma-Aldrich (Global Distribution of DSC and ssDSC Materials)
- TASNEE (Assistance with future funding and guarantees), Saudi Arabia
- Cristal (Supplying Nano-Titania for use by Dyesol partners), Saudi Arabia

Suppliers

- Sefar AG Supplying transparent conducting film for use by Dyesol partners
- Pilkington Supplying Transparent Conductive Oxides for use by Dyesol partners
- Umicore Supplying liquid DSC dyes for use by Dyesol partners
- SIA Engineering Company/Meerkat Manufacturing facilities for use by Dyesol Partners

Industrial Consumers

- G24 Innovations Ltd. (Dyes)
- Nesli DSC (Turkey)

Distribution

- TATA Steel Europe Colorcoat Steel Roofing & Siding
- ThyssenKrupp
- CSR Viridian
