= Wartburgkreis II – Eisenach =

Electoral constituency in Thuringia, Germany

Wartburgkreis II – Eisenach is an electoral constituency (German: Wahlkreis) represented in the Landtag of Thuringia. It elects one member via first-past-the-post voting. Under the current constituency numbering system, it is designated as constituency 6. It covers the city of Eisenach and central-western parts of Wartburgkreis.

Wartburgkreis II – Eisenach was created for the 1994 state election. Since 2014, it has been represented by Raymond Walk of the Christian Democratic Union (CDU).

== Geography ==
As of the 2019 state election, Wartburgkreis II – Eisenach contains the urban district of Eisenach and central-western parts of Wartburgkreis, specifically the municipalities of Bad Salzungen (excluding Ettenhausen an der Suhl), Gerstungen, and Werra-Suhl-Tal.

== Members ==
The constituency was held by the Christian Democratic Union from its creation in 1994 until 2009, during which time it was represented by Christian Köckert. It was won by The Left in 2009, and represented by Katja Wolf. The seat was regained by the CDU in 2014, and represented by Raymond Walk. He was re-elected in 2019.

Election	Member	Party	%
1994	Christian Köckert	CDU	40.5
1999	Christian Köckert	CDU	49.3
2004	Christian Köckert	CDU	40.1
2009	Katja Wolf	LINKE	28.4
2014	Raymond Walk	CDU	37.4
2019	Raymond Walk	CDU	26.9
2024	Ulrike Jary	CDU	42.4

== Election results ==
=== 2024 election ===
State election (2024): Eichsfeld I
Notes:	Blue background denotes the winner of the electorate vote. Pink background denotes a candidate elected from their party list. Yellow background denotes an electorate win by a list member, or other incumbent. A ✓ or ✗ denotes status of any incumbent, win or lose respectively.						
Party	Candidate	Votes	%	±%	Party votes	%	±%
AfD					10,131	33.6	▲11.2
CDU	Ulrike Jary	10,645	42.4	▲15.5	7,617	25.3	▲4.7
BSW	Katja Wolf	7,072	28.2		4,315	14.3	
Left	Philipp Pommer	3,229	12.9	▼13.4	3,744	12.4	▼19.1
SPD	Christoph Hohmann	2,896	11.5	▲2.0	2,023	6.7	▼1.6
Greens					740	2.5	▼2.5
FDP	Robert-Martin Monday	1,262	5.0	▲0.7	314	1.0	▼3.9
APT					314	1.1	▲0.1
FW					293	1.0	
Familie					140	0.5	
Values					133	0.4	
BD					101	0.3	
Pirates					99	0.3	▼0.1
ÖDP					82	0.3	▼0.1
MLPD					63	0.2	▼0.2
Informal votes		5,354			326		
Total valid votes		25,104			30,132		
Turnout		30,458	69.9	▲7.3			
CDU hold	Majority	3,573	14.2	▲13.6			

=== 2019 election ===
State election (2019): Wartburgkreis II – Eisenach
Notes:	Blue background denotes the winner of the electorate vote. Pink background denotes a candidate elected from their party list. Yellow background denotes an electorate win by a list member, or other incumbent. A ✓ or ✗ denotes status of any incumbent, win or lose respectively.						
Party	Candidate	Votes	%	±%	Party votes	%	±%
CDU	✓ Raymond Walk	7,625	26.9	▼10.5	5,849	20.6	▼10.6
Left	Kati Engel	7,450	26.3	▼7.3	8,946	31.5	▲1.7
AfD	Susi Schreiber	6,943	24.5		6,371	22.4	▲14.4
SPD	Babette Winter	2,683	9.5	▼3.1	2,373	8.3	▼4.3
Greens	Robert Kirchner	1,732	6.1	▼1.0	1,424	5.0	▼1.4
FDP	Kord-Henning Uber	1,219	4.3	▲1.9	1,386	4.9	▲2.8
Free Voters	Maik Helbig	527	1.9				
MLPD	Friedrich Hofmann	175	0.6		105	0.4	
List-only parties					1,975	6.9	
Informal votes		423			348		
Total valid votes		28,354			28,429		
Turnout		28,777	62.6	▲10.1			
CDU hold	Majority	175	0.6	▼3.2			

=== 2014 election ===
State election (2014): Wartburgkreis II – Eisenach
Notes:	Blue background denotes the winner of the electorate vote. Pink background denotes a candidate elected from their party list. Yellow background denotes an electorate win by a list member, or other incumbent. A ✓ or ✗ denotes status of any incumbent, win or lose respectively.						
Party	Candidate	Votes	%	±%	Party votes	%	±%
CDU	Raymond Walk	9,234	37.4	▲10.5	7,764	31.2	▲3.1
Left	Christiane Leischner	8,284	33.6	▲5.2	7,414	27.5	▲2.3
SPD	Heidrun Sachse	3,110	12.6	▼5.1	3,123	12.6	▼6.7
AfD					1,983	8.0	
Greens	Rüdiger Bender	1,739	7.1	▲0.1	1,592	6.4	▼1.2
NPD	Patrick Wieschke	1,697	6.9	▲1.7	1,484	6.0	▲1.0
FDP	Sebastian Bethge	597	2.4	▼4.6	530	2.1	▼4.8
List-only parties					960	3.9	
Informal votes		545			356		
Total valid votes		24,661			24,850		
Turnout		25,206	52.5	▼3.1			
CDU gain from Left	Majority	950	3.8				

=== 2009 election ===
State election (2009): Wartburgkreis II – Eisenach
Notes:	Blue background denotes the winner of the electorate vote. Pink background denotes a candidate elected from their party list. Yellow background denotes an electorate win by a list member, or other incumbent. A ✓ or ✗ denotes status of any incumbent, win or lose respectively.						
Party	Candidate	Votes	%	±%	Party votes	%	±%
Left	Katja Wolf	7,762	28.4	▼1.5	7,564	27.5	▼0.1
CDU	Regina Müller	7,342	26.9	▼13.2	7,725	28.1	▼11.7
SPD	Heiko Gentzel	4,832	17.7	▲0.5	5,301	19.3	▲3.0
Free Voters	Thomas Herrmann	2,138	7.8		1,285	4.7	▲3.0
FDP	Heidemarie Bischoff	1,917	7.0	▲2.9	1,901	6.9	▲3.6
Greens	Stefan Schweßinger	1,905	7.0	▼1.8	2,085	7.6	▲1.3
NPD	Patrick Wieschke	1,428	5.2		1,368	5.0	▲4.0
List-only parties					241	0.9	
Informal votes		640			494		
Total valid votes		27,324			27,470		
Turnout		27,964	55.6	▲3.6			
Left gain from CDU	Majority	420	1.5				

=== 2004 election ===
State election (2004): Wartburgkreis II – Eisenach
Notes:	Blue background denotes the winner of the electorate vote. Pink background denotes a candidate elected from their party list. Yellow background denotes an electorate win by a list member, or other incumbent. A ✓ or ✗ denotes status of any incumbent, win or lose respectively.						
Party	Candidate	Votes	%	±%	Party votes	%	±%
CDU	✓ Christian Köckert	10,278	40.1	▼9.2	10,287	39.8	▼10.4
PDS	Katja Wolf	7,677	29.9	▲8.6	7,135	27.6	▲6.8
SPD	Heiko Gentzel	4,418	17.2	▼3.6	4,201	16.3	▼4.4
Greens	Gisela Rexrodt	2,248	8.8	▲4.2	1,615	6.3	▲3.8
FDP	Heike Bahn-Schultz	1,040	4.1	▲2.2	847	3.3	▲2.1
List-only parties					1,732	6.7	
Informal votes		1,124			968		
Total valid votes		25,661			25,817		
Turnout		26,785	52.0	▼7.3			
CDU hold	Majority	2,601	10.2	▼17.8			

=== 1999 election ===
State election (1999): Wartburgkreis II – Eisenach
Notes:	Blue background denotes the winner of the electorate vote. Pink background denotes a candidate elected from their party list. Yellow background denotes an electorate win by a list member, or other incumbent. A ✓ or ✗ denotes status of any incumbent, win or lose respectively.						
Party	Candidate	Votes	%	±%	Party votes	%	±%
CDU	✓ Christian Köckert	14,661	49.3	▲8.9	14,987	50.2	▲10.6
PDS	Karin May	6,343	21.3	▲5.1	6,205	20.8	▲4.1
SPD	Heiko Gentzel	6,184	20.8	▼11.2	6,179	20.7	▼11.6
Greens	Gisela Rexroth	1,372	4.6	▼2.5	731	2.5	▼3.0
REP	Jenny Stüwe	590	2.0	▲0.5	198	0.7	▼0.6
FDP	Heidemarie Bischoff	565	1.9	▼0.9	350	1.2	▼1.2
List-only parties					1,179	4.0	
Informal votes		528			414		
Total valid votes		29,715			29,829		
Turnout		30,243	59.3	▼14.9			
CDU hold	Majority	8,318	28.0	▲19.6			

=== 1994 election ===
State election (1994): Wartburgkreis II
Notes:	Blue background denotes the winner of the electorate vote. Pink background denotes a candidate elected from their party list. Yellow background denotes an electorate win by a list member, or other incumbent. A ✓ or ✗ denotes status of any incumbent, win or lose respectively.						
Party	Candidate	Votes	%	±%	Party votes	%	±%
CDU	Christian Köckert	15,106	40.5		14,909	39.7	
SPD	Heiko Gentzel	11,941	32.0		12,135	32.3	
PDS	Roland Wanitschka	6,022	16.1		6,222	16.6	
Greens	Christine Grabe	2,630	7.0		2,066	5.5	
FDP	Gerhard Lorenz	1,069	2.9		913	2.4	
REP	Lutz Diener	554	1.5		509	1.4	
List-only parties					798	2.2	
Informal votes		1,121			891		
Total valid votes		37,322			37,552		
Turnout		38,443	74.2				
CDU win new seat	Majority	3,165	8.5				
