= Henry Snaith =

British Professor of Physics

Henry Snaith FRS
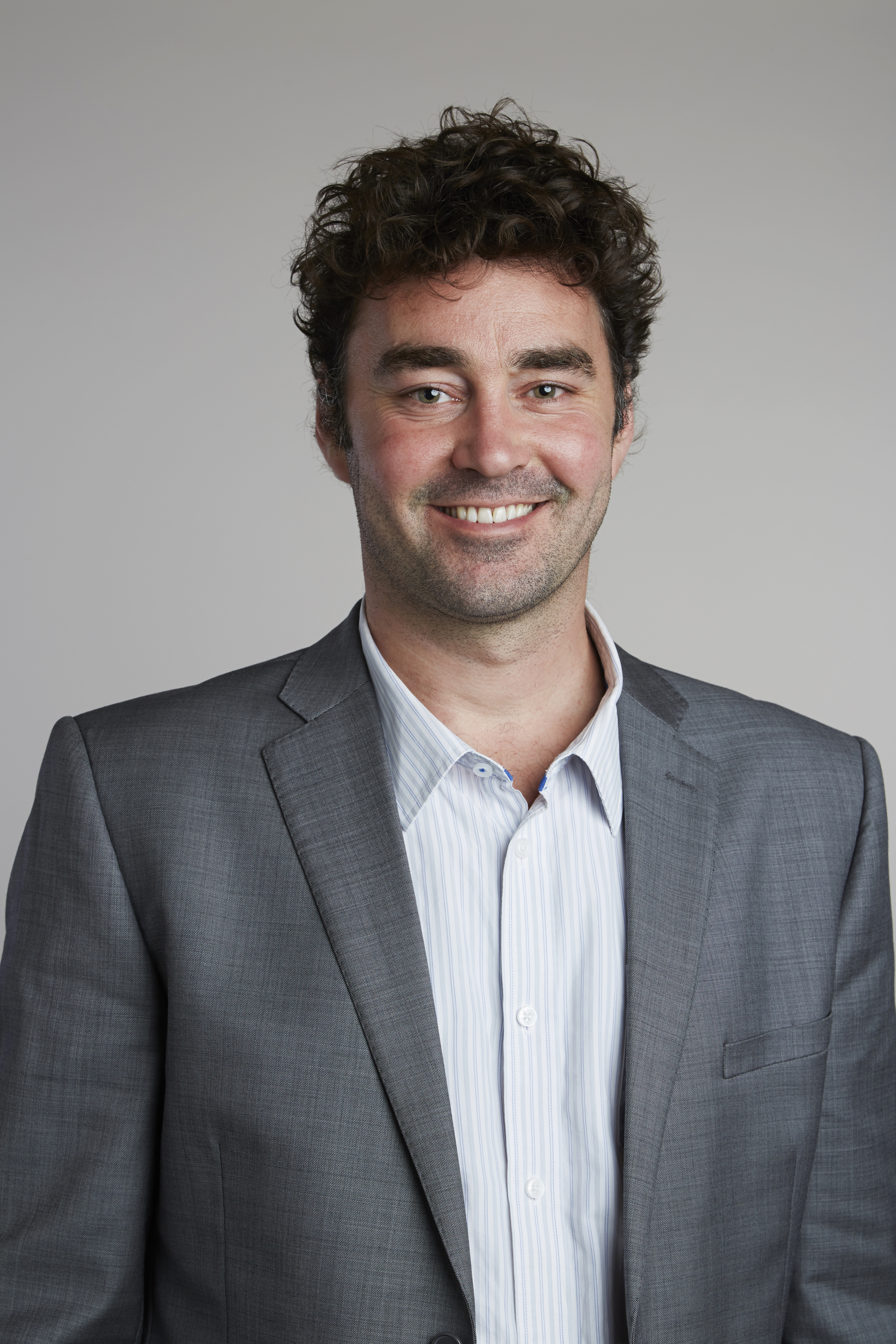
- Henry Snaith in 2015
- Born: Henry James Snaith; January 1978 (age 48)
- Education: Gresham's School
- Alma mater: University of Bristol (BSc); University of Cambridge (PhD)
- Awards: Nature's 10 (2013); Blavatnik Awards for Young Scientists (2018)
- Scientific career
- Fields: Physics; Solar cells; Perovskite solar cells; Photovoltaics; Optoelectronics
- Workplaces: University of Oxford; Oxford Martin School; Clarendon Laboratory; Cavendish Laboratory; Oxford Photovoltaics; École Polytechnique Fédérale de Lausanne
- Thesis: Polymer based photovoltaic diodes (2005)
- Doctoral advisor: Richard Friend
- Other academic advisors: Michael Grätzel
- Website: www2.physics.ox.ac.uk/contacts/people/snaith

Henry James Snaith (born 1978) FRS is a professor in physics in the Clarendon Laboratory at the University of Oxford. Research from his group has led to the creation of a new research field, based on halide perovskites for use as solar absorbers. Many individuals who were PhD students and postdoctoral researchers in Snaith's group have now established research groups, independent research portfolios and commercial enterprises. He co-founded Oxford Photovoltaics in 2010 to commercialise perovskite based tandem solar cells.

== Education ==
Snaith was educated at Gresham's School, an independent school in Norfolk, from 1989 to 1996. He completed his undergraduate studies at the University of Bristol, followed by postgraduate research at the University of Cambridge where he was awarded a PhD in 2005 for research on polymer solar cells supervised by Richard Friend.

== Career and research ==
Following his PhD, Snaith did two years of postdoctoral research with Michael Grätzel at the École Polytechnique Fédérale de Lausanne (EPFL). He returned to the Cavendish Laboratory as a Junior Research Fellow at Clare College, Cambridge in 2006. Following this, Snaith was appointed a Research Councils UK (RCUK) research fellow while at the University of Oxford, then promoted to Reader and Professor. According to a biography from the Materials Research Society (MRS):

His research has been focused on new materials and device architectures for future generation low-cost photovoltaic. Snaith's achievements include the first demonstration of "gyroid" structured titania for dye solar cells, the first demonstration of mesoporous single crystals of anatase TiO_{2} and the recent discovery of high efficiency solid-state organometal trihalide perovskite-based thin film and mesosuperstructured solar cells. In 2010, he founded Oxford Photovoltaics Ltd., which is commercialising perovskite solar cells for building integrated and utility scale photovoltaic applications.

Snaith's research has been funded by the Engineering and Physical Sciences Research Council (EPSRC).

=== Awards and honours ===
Snaith was elected a Fellow of the Royal Society (FRS) in 2015. His certificate of election reads:

Professor Henry Snaith has pioneered the development of hybrid materials for energy and photovoltaics through an interdisciplinary combination of materials synthesis, device development, advanced optoelectronic characterisations and theoretical studies. He has created new materials with advanced functionality and enhanced understanding of fundamental mechanisms. His recent discovery of extremely efficient thin-film solar cells manufactured from organic-inorganic metal halide perovskites has reset aspirations within the photovoltaics community. His work has started a new field of research, attracting both academic and industrial following, propelled by the prospect of delivering a higher efficiency photovoltaic technology at a much lower cost than existing silicon PV.

In 2012, Snaith was Institute of Physics Clifford Paterson Medal and Prize for "his important contributions to the field of excitonic solar cells".

In 2014, Snaith was awarded the MRS Outstanding Young Investigator Award. He was awarded the Patterson Medal of the Institute of Physics in 2012, and named as one of Nature's ten people who mattered in 2013.

In 2015, Snaith was ranked number two on the list of The World's Most Influential Scientific Minds, a citation analysis identifying the scientists who have made the most significant impact within their respective field of study by the Intellectual Property (IP) and Science business of Thomson Reuters. In May 2016, he was awarded the EU-40 Materials Prize from the European Material Research Society.

In October 2017, he was awarded the Institute of Physics James Joule Medal and Prize for the discovery and development of organic-inorganic metal-halide perovskite solar cells. In September 2020, he was awarded the Becquerel Prize in honour of his contributions to the use of perovskites as solar cells.
