= Colorcoat =

Colorcoat is a brand owned by steel company Tata Steel Europe, and is the name given to its pre-finished steel products which are commonly used for the building envelope.

The Colorcoat product range consists of Colorcoat Prisma, and its flagship product, Colorcoat HPS200 Ultra.

Recent efforts have been made in the UK and the Netherlands to revitalise the Colorcoat brand, which has been in existence for over 40 years, as the brand name was almost used as a generic term for pre-finished steel on the building envelope within the European construction industry .

Current research in Shotton, Wales, is aimed at making dye-sensitized solar cell Colorcoat roofs.
