= Frieder Lippmann =

German politician (1936–2023)

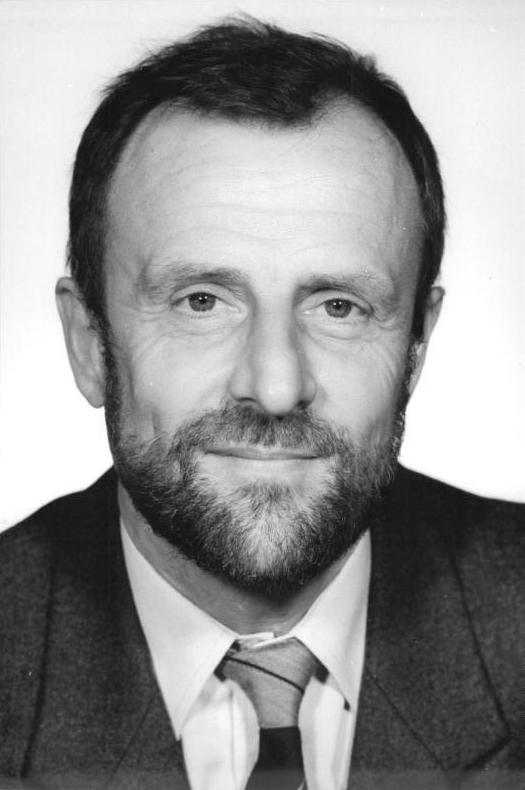
- Born: 3 September 1936; Dorfchemnitz, Germany
- Died: 18 September 2023 (aged 87)
- Occupation: Politician
- Political party: SDP (East); SPD

Frieder Lippmann (3 September 1936 – 18 September 2023) was a German politician (SPD). He was a member of the East German national parliament (Volkstag) and of the regional parliament (Landtag) of Thuringia.

== Life ==
=== Provenance and early years ===
Frieder Lippmann was born into a working-class family at Dorfchemnitz, a small town in the Eastern Ore Mountain region ("Osterzgebirge"), a short distance to the north of the German frontier with what had recently become known as the Czechoslovak Sudetenland. His grandfather had been a committed member of the Social Democratic Party but had died when Lippmann was only ten, leaving the boy to find his own way to an interest in politics only many years later.

War ended in May 1945, putting an end to the Nazi régime and leaving the central portion of Germany administered as the Soviet occupation zone, to be relaunched and rebranded in October 1949 as the Soviet sponsored German Democratic Republic (East Germany). Lippmann attended school locally between 1943 and 1955, the year in which he passed his school final exams ("Abitur"), an exam result which in due course would clear the path to university level education. For the next five years he worked in the region's coal and ore mines. Sources describe him as a coal-face worker. Nevertheless, there was also the opportunity to study, and in 1960 he emerged from the Zwickau Mines Engineering Academy with an engineering degree.

Between 1960 and 1965 he worked as a middle manager ("... im Steigerdienst") at the Maxhütte ) iron-ore mine at Schmiedefeld, in the southern part of Thuringia. He combined this with a correspondence study course from the Freiberg Mining Academy. Sources are silent as to whether this led to further qualifications, but in 1965 it was followed by new job responsibilities. Between 1965 and 1990 Lippmann worked successively as an academic assistant, project engineer and group leader. Subsequently, he was involved in project planning at the Research Institute for Pig Iron Production and the Construction Institute at Unterwellenborn.

=== Politics ===
East Germany under Ulbricht and Honecker was a very different place from Germany under Hitler, but it was still a one-party dictatorship. Popular backing for the government could never be taken for granted. There is no sign that Lippmann ever joined the ruling party. He himself stated later that he came to politics through the media, and he identified with leading Social Democrats through watching political debates on television. In East Germany the Social Democratic Party had been forcibly subsumed into the ruling party back in 1946, and it is not clear which leading Social Democrats he had in mind with this comment. It is certainly the case that comrades living near the Inner German border would, under some circumstances, have been able (illegally) to watch television programmes from West Germany, where the SPD was one of the two largest mainstream political parties. From the media and/or from less formal information sources, Lippmann was well aware of the Charter 77 civic initiative in nearby Czechoslovakia, the rise of "Solidarity" in neighbouring Poland through the 1980s and of the "Place of Heavenly Peace" atrocities in June 1989. He was appalled by the reaction of East Germany's ruling SED party and the "Bloc parties" which it controlled, which celebrated the suppression of student protests in Tiananmen Square in ways which "no honest person understood" ("... was kein ehrlicher Mensch verstand"). For Lippmann, that became a defining moment for East Germany's own unfolding "peaceful revolution" of 1989/90.

During the German Democratic Republic's final decade, as the winds of Glasnost blew across from, of all places, Moscow, the East German government experienced a progressive loss of confidence: towards the later 1980s the country saw a surge in street protests. This was a reflection of political discussions taking place in homes, out of reach, as the participants would have hoped, of government informers. Late one night in early September 1989, ten people with an interest in improving the political situation in East Germany met together in the shed in Frieder Lippmann's garden. They all had so-called "technical" backgrounds which, participants believed, reduced the risk that one of them would be a Stasi informer. There were no informers present (though two would later leave the group). They discussed their political aspirations for their country, including the introduction of a parliamentary democracy with free and fair elections. They discussed a return to the federal administrative structure that had disappeared in 1952 when the centralising preferences of the politburo had led to the abolition of the state-level tier of government. They even discussed the idea of some sort of confederation with West Germany. (It never occurred to any of them that full reunification between East and West Germany might become a possibility.) Although what they were discussing amounted to a radical political programme, there was no ambition at this point to go so far as to found a Social Democratic Party in what remained, as far as those present understood, a one-party state. There was a remarkable level of agreement on a future trajectory for East Germany, but they aspired only to create a group similar to those that had been beginning to form under the auspices of various parish churches, concerning themselves with environmental issues and political freedoms. With this in mind, the participants in the garden shed meeting now held several further meetings.

Those subsequent meetings were consciously non-conspiratorial in spirit, but it was nevertheless quickly concluded that creating a political party would be a more effective way of progressing. Events elsewhere suggested that such a move might actually be becoming possible. Then, towards the end of October, news came through that an East German Social Democratic Party had been founded at Schwante, just outside Berlin. Members of Lippmann's group set about making contact with members of similar groups in neighbouring towns. He started by meeting up with Simone Manz, a dentist in Rudolstadt: they agreed to stay in touch. Studiously casual encounters took place with embryonic SDP groups from nearby Greiz, Gera, Pößneck und Saalfeld. In October 1989 Lippmann, like many others, joined the re-emerging (East German) Social Democratic Party. In November 1989 protesters broke through the Berlin Wall, and it quickly became clear that the Soviet troops had received no instructions from Moscow to undertake a fraternal intervention and put a stop to political developments on the East Berlin streets, as their predecessors had done back in 1953 (or, more recently in Czechoslovakia, in 1968). By the end of 1989 Lippmann had become chair of the SDP's Saalfeld group. In January 1990 the new party held its first national congress at Gotha, followed by a political rally in the town square at which Lippmann, standing crushed with others in the crowd, had the surreal experience of being able to cheer Willy Brandt. That month he became SPD chair for the Saalfeld sub-region. Later that year he became deputy chair of the regional party executive for the Saalfeld-Rudolstadt district.

East Germany's first (and as matters turned out last) free and fair general election took place in March 1990. For the first time since the founding of the state, results were reported that showed the ruling SED party receiving fewer than 99% of the votes cast. (They received 16.4%.) No party won an overall majority, but the leading party, the CDU achieved 40.8% of the vote. The SDP were in second place with 21.9%. Frieder Lippmann was listed in third place on his party's candidate list for the Gera electoral district: his name was high enough up on the list to secure him a seat in the resulting national parliament (Volkskammer). On 13 January 1990 the East German SDP had changed its name to SPD, in anticipation of an ever-closer collaboration with the West German SPD (although actual fusion tool place only on 26 September 1990). In February 1990 Oskar Lafontaine the leader of the West German party gave a speech to a party congress in which he urged caution over a possible "German reunification". Lafontaine was still convinced that, from a western perspective, rapid reunification with a virtually bankrupt East German state was simply unaffordable. Lippmann was horrified, and believed that Lafontaine's attitude would be damaging to the party's prospects in the East German election in March. He was therefore surprised to find himself elected, and experienced seven months of "grand coalition" government during which east-west tensions within the SPD were far more obvious than for their partners, the centre-right CDU. Lippmann remained a Volkskammer member till October 1990 when, in the context of reunification, the parliament was subsumed into an enlarged version of the (hitherto West) German Bundestag. As part of the arrangements agreed, 144 of the 400 Volkskammer members - including 33 from the SDP - transferred to the enlarged Bundestag, but Lippmann was not among them.

During 1990 Lippmann also became a member of the SPD party executive for Thuringia, which was formally reinstated as a federal state ("Bundesland") in October. The restoration of Thuringia's status as a political region was accompanied by the return of the regional parliament ("Landtag"). Elections were held on 14 October 1990: Frieder Lippmann was one of the 21 SPD members elected to membership of the 88 seat legislature. The second election to the Landtag took place on 16 October 1994 and was a triumph for the Thuringian SPD which saw the number of its seats increase from 21 to 29: this led to participation with the CDU in a governing coalition. Lippmann became leader of the SPD group in the Landtag, retaining the position till 1999. After the next election, in 1999 the party was reduced to 18 of the 88 seats, and Lippmann stepped down from his leadership position, while attributing the disappointing result to the national economic situation. Leadership of the SPD in the Landtag passed to Heiko Gentzel, a man who later described Frieder Lippmann as "the best human being he ever came across in the entire party" ("der sei vom Menschlichen her das Tollste, was ihm in der SPD je begegnet ist."). The respect was presumably mutual, since between 1999 and 2004 Lippmann spoke for the party on economic policy in the Landtag.

== Personal life and death ==
Frieder Lippmann was married with two children, and later had grandchildren. He died on 18 September 2023, at the age of 87.
