= Michael Grätzel =

Swiss professor (born 1944)

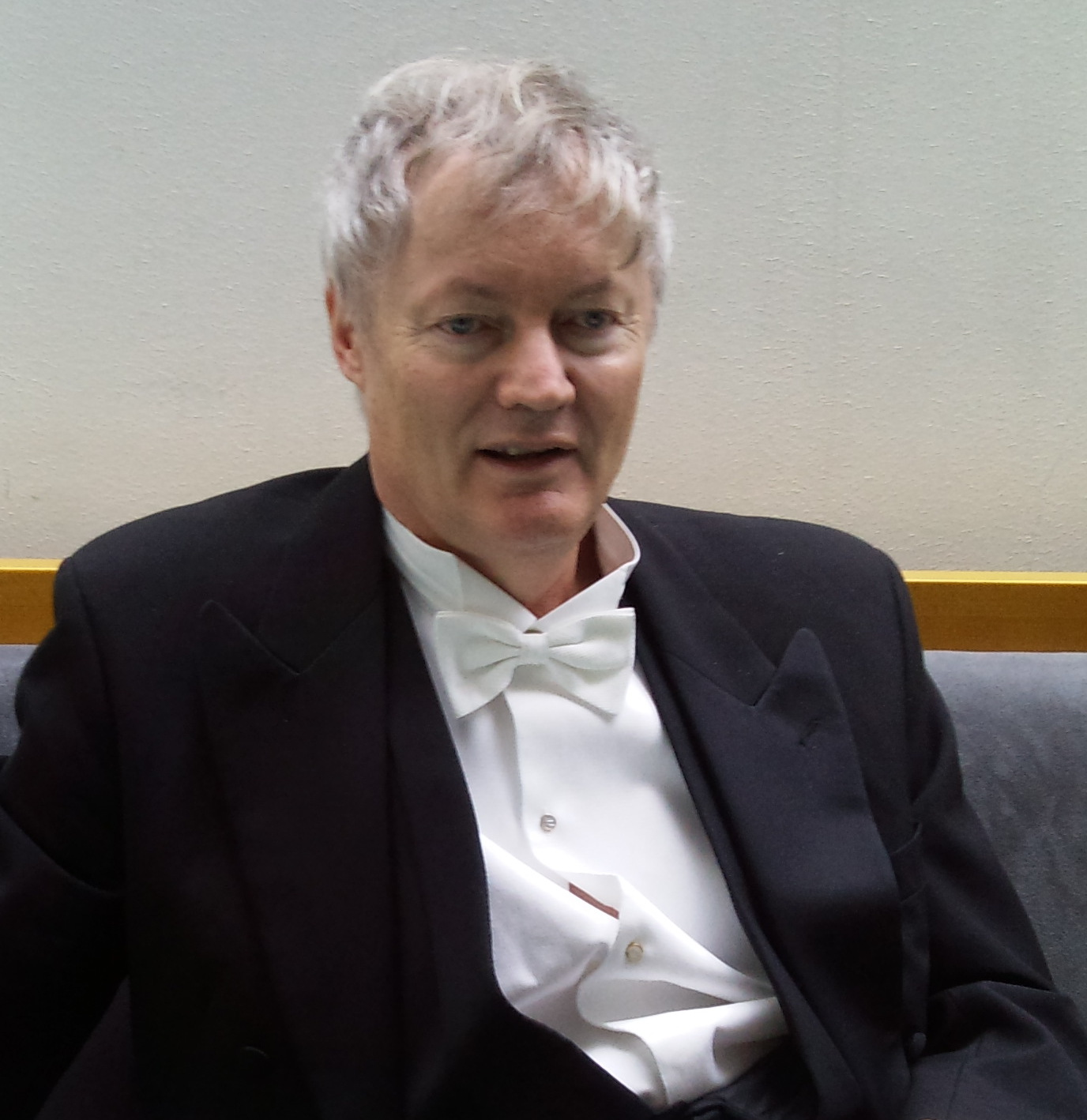
- Born: 11 May 1944 (age 82); Dorfchemnitz, Saxony, Germany
- Education: Free University of Berlin; Technische Universität Berlin
- Known for: Dye-sensitized solar cells
- Awards: Harvey Prize (2007); Balzan Prize (2009); Millennium Technology Prize (2010); Albert Einstein World Award of Science (2012); Marcel Benoist Prize (2013); King Faisal International Prize (2015); Global Energy Prize (2017)
- Scientific career
- Fields: photochemistry
- Workplaces: Free University of Berlin; École Polytechnique Fédérale de Lausanne
- Thesis: Pulsradiolytische Untersuchung kurzlebiger Stickstoff-Sauerstoffverbindungen in wässriger Lösung (1971)
- Doctoral advisor: Arnim Henglein
- Other academic advisors: J. Kerry Thomas
- Notable students: Henry Snaith (postdoc)
- Website: lpi.epfl.ch/graetzel

Michael Grätzel (born 11 May 1944, in Dorfchemnitz, Saxony, Germany) is a professor at the École Polytechnique Fédérale de Lausanne where he directs the Laboratory of Photonics and Interfaces. He pioneered research on energy and electron transfer reactions in mesoscopic-materials and their optoelectronic applications. He co-invented with Brian O'Regan the Grätzel cell in 1988. Grätzel has been called the "father of artificial photosynthesis".

Grätzel is the author of over 1000 publications, two books and inventor or co-inventor of over 80 patents, he has been the Mary Upton Visiting Professor at Cornell University and a distinguished visiting professor at the National University of Singapore, and is currently a distinguished scientist at King Abdulaziz University. He was an invited professor at the University of California, Berkeley, the École normale supérieure Paris-Saclay and Delft University of Technology.

== Education and career ==
In 1968 he graduated from Free University of Berlin, in 1971 he earned the Doctor of Philosophy in natural science at Technische Universität Berlin. In 1976 he completed habilitation in physical chemistry at the Free University of Berlin. Since 1977 to the present day he is a professor at the École Polytechnique Fédérale de Lausanne in Lausanne, where he directs the Laboratory of Photonics and Interfaces. He worked as postdoctoral research fellow, lecturer, visiting professor at the Hahn-Meitner Institute, Free University of Berlin, University of California at Berkeley, Ecole Normale Supérieure de Cachan, Oil and Gas Research Fund, University of Notre Dame and other educational and research centers. In 1991, he published his breakthrough work in Nature magazine with regard to the new type of solar cells based on a three-dimensional array of tiny (mesoscopic) oxide semiconductor particles with wide band gap covered with an organic pigment that have brought the name of professor into repute and were named as Grätzel cells. Grätzel is the holder of 10 honorary doctorates in Universities of Asia and Europe: Denmark, Holland, China, Sweden, Singapore and other countries. He is the laureate of tens of prestigious scientific and engineering prizes, such as Grand Prix “Millennium Technology”, Medal of Faraday granted by British Royal Society, Gutenberg Prize, Albert Einstein Prize and others.

Grätzel is a member of the Swiss Chemical Society, the Max Planck Society, and the German Academy of Science (Leopoldina), as well as an honorable member of the Israeli Chemical Society and the Bulgarian Academy of Science, an honorary fellow of the Royal Society of Chemistry, and a Fellow of the US-National Academy of Inventors.

== Scientific achievements ==
Grätzel is one of the inventors of dye-sensitized solar cells, the so-called Grätzel cells; a new type of solar cell, operating on similar principles as photosynthesis.

== Recognition ==
Grätzel's work has been cited over 515,000 times, his h-index is 315, making him one of the most highly cited chemists in the world. He was a frequent guest scientist at the National Renewable Energy Laboratory (NREL) in Golden, Colorado, was a fellow of the Japanese Society for the Promotion of Science. In 2009 he was named Distinguished Honorary Professor by the Chinese Academy of Science (Changchun) and the Huazhong University of Science and Technology.

Grätzel has received numerous awards including the Millennium 2000 European innovation prize, the 2001 Faraday Medal of the British Royal Society, the 2001 Dutch Havinga Award, the 2004 Italgas Prize, two McKinsey Venture awards in 1998 and 2002 and the 2005 Gerischer Prize. In 2007 he was awarded the Harvey Prize of Technion for pioneered research on energy and electron transfer reactions in mesoscopic-materials and their optoelectronic applications. In 2009 he was awarded the Balzan Prize for the Science of New Materials. On 9 June 2010, Grätzel received the Millennium Technology Prize, for development of dye-sensitized solar cells. The cash prize, worth 800,000 euros, was awarded, in Helsinki, Finland, by the president of Finland, Tarja Halonen. His most recent awards include: 2011 Gutenberg Research Award; 2011 Paul Karrer Gold Medal; 2011 Wilhelm Exner Medal; 2012 Albert Einstein World Award of Science; and the 2013 Marcel Benoist Prize. In 2015 he received the King Faisal International Prize in Chemistry and in 2017 the Global Energy Prize "for transcendent merits in development of low cost and efficient solar cells, known as “Grätzel cells”, aimed to creation of cost-efficient, large-scale engineering solutions for power generation." In 2020 he received the BBVA Foundation Frontiers of Knowledge Award.

- 2025: Pour le Mérite for Sciences and Arts

Grätzel holds honorary doctorates from Faculty of Science and Technology at Uppsala University, Sweden (1996), Turin and Nova Gorica. He was elected honorary member of the Société Vaudoise des Sciences Naturelles. Grätzel is a member of the scientific advisory committee at the IMDEA Nanoscience Institute.

== See also ==
- Grätzel cell (Dye-sensitized solar cell)
- Photoelectrochemical cell
- Perovskite solar cell

== Notes and references ==
Preceded by Robert S. Langer	Millennium Technology Prize winner 2010 (for dye-sensitized solar cells)	Succeeded by Linus Torvalds; Shinya Yamanaka
