= Ulrike Jary =

German politician (born 1985)

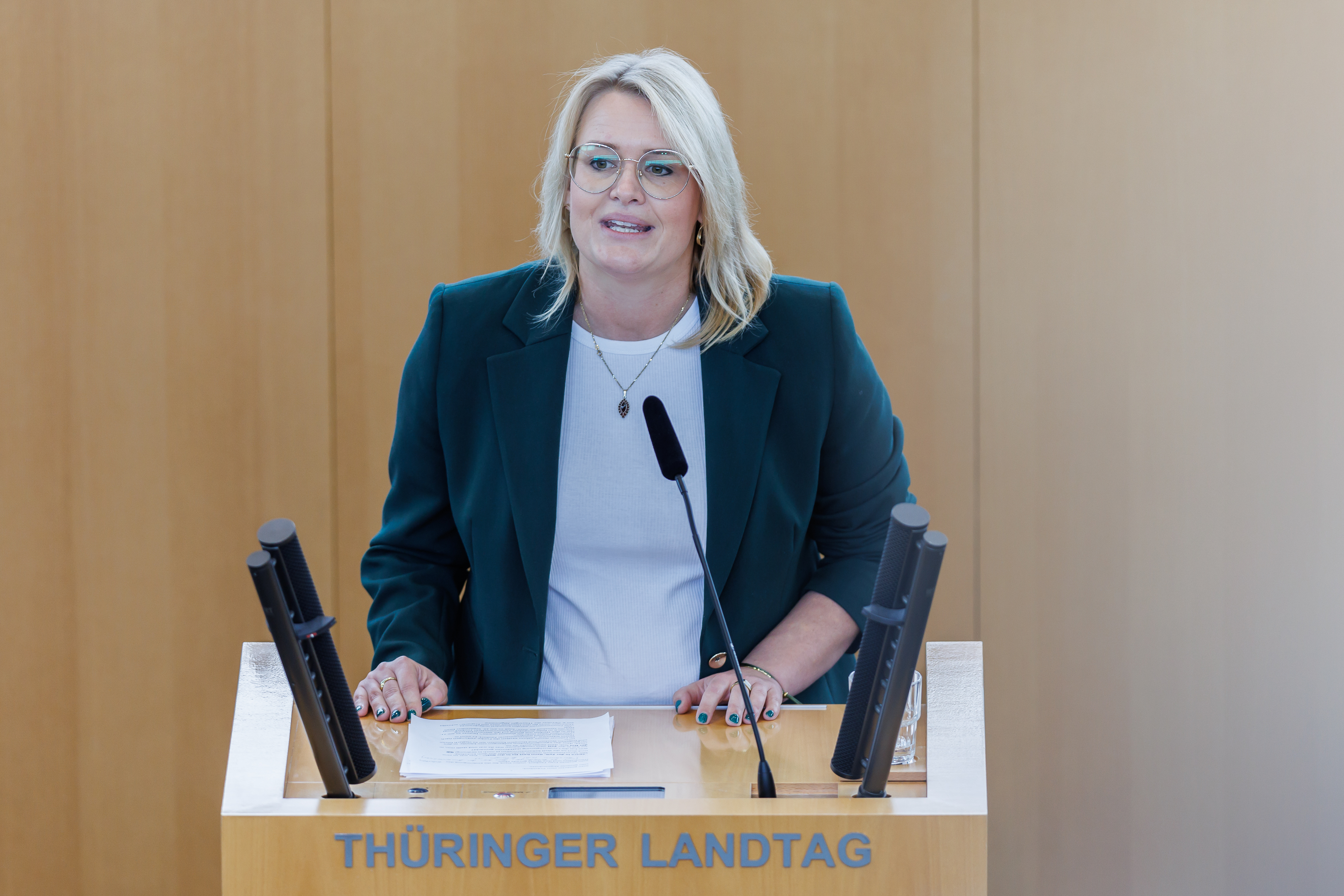
- Jary in 2024

Member of the Landtag of Thuringia
- Incumbent
- Assumed office 26 September 2024
- Preceded by: Raymond Walk
- Constituency: Wartburgkreis II – Eisenach

Personal details
- Born: 10 June 1985 (age 40)
- Party: Christian Democratic Union (since 2005)

Ulrike Jary (born 10 June 1985) is a German politician serving as a member of the Landtag of Thuringia since 2024. She has served as chief whip of the Christian Democratic Union since 2024.
