= Dorfchemnitz =

- Municipality
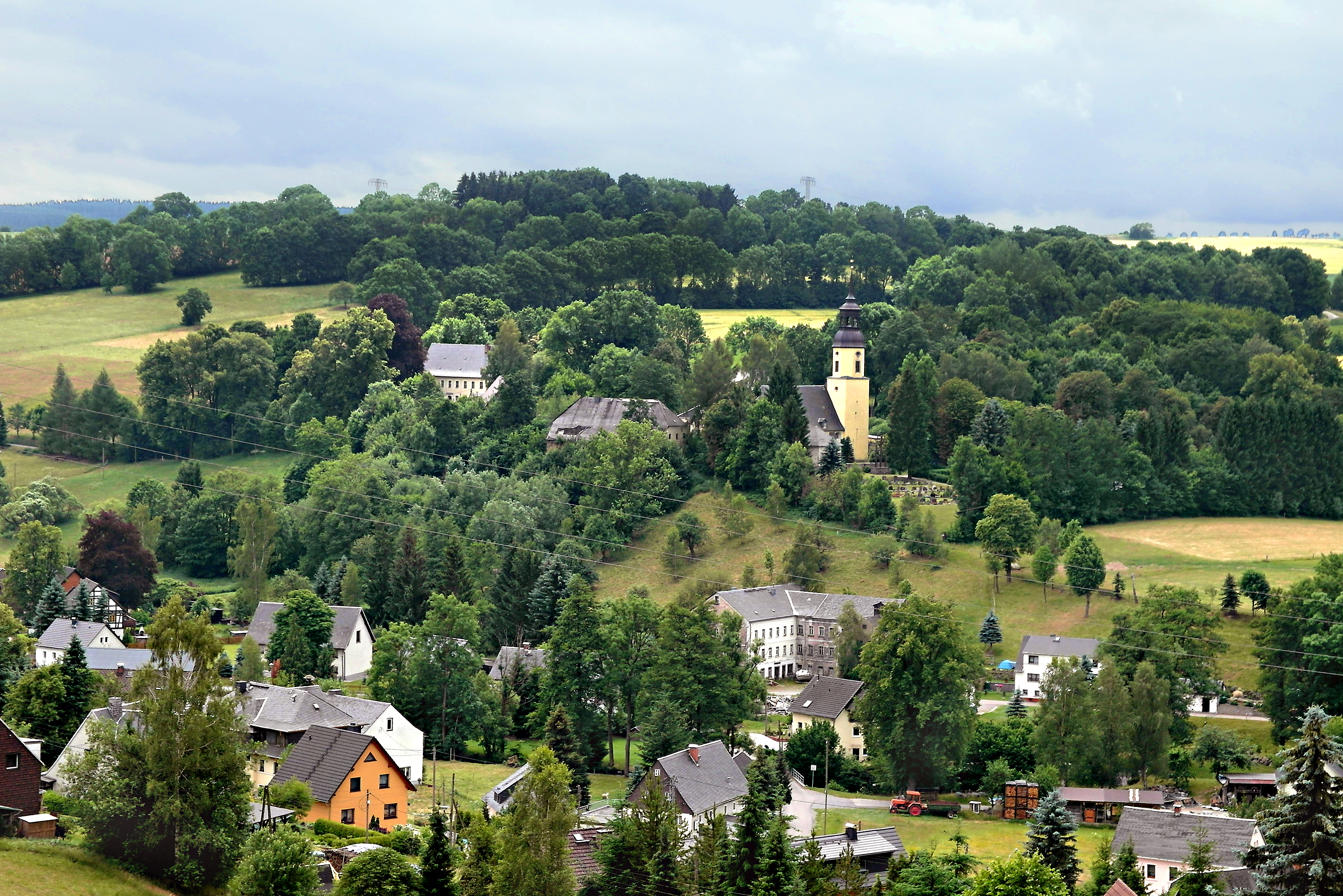
- View from the north east

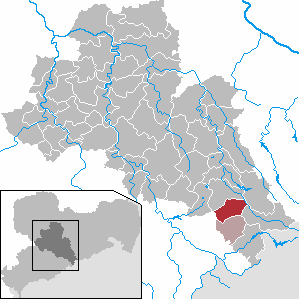
- Location of Dorfchemnitz within Mittelsachsen district
- Interactive map of Dorfchemnitz
- Location within Germany Location within Saxony
- Coordinates: 50°45′51″N 13°26′48″E
- Country: Germany
- State: Saxony
- District: Mittelsachsen

Government
  - Mayor (2022–29): Thomas Schurig

Area
  - Total: 29.53 km^{2} (11.40 sq mi)
- Elevation: 572 m (1,877 ft)

Population (2025-12-31)
  - Total: 1,411
  - Density: 47.78/km^{2} (123.8/sq mi)
- Time zone: UTC+01:00 (CET)
  - Summer (DST): UTC+02:00 (CEST)
- Postal codes: 09619
- Dialling codes: 037320, 037365
- Vehicle registration: FG

Dorfchemnitz is a municipality in the district of Mittelsachsen, in Saxony, Germany.

== Famous people born in Dorfchemnitz ==
- Frieder Lippmann (born 3 September 1936), German politician
- Michael Grätzel (born 11 May 1944), professor at the École Polytechnique Fédérale de Lausanne
