= Oxford Photovoltaics =

Solar company in the United Kingdom

Oxford Photovoltaics Limited
- Trade name: Oxford PV
- Type: Private limited company
- Industry: Photovoltaics; Perovskite solar cells
- Founded: 2010
- Founder: Henry Snaith; Kevin Arthur
- Headquarters: Yarnton, United Kingdom
- Key people: David Ward; Chris Case; Henry Snaith; Christian Langen
- Website: oxfordpv.com

Oxford Photovoltaics Limited, doing business as Oxford PV, is British solar technology company and Oxford University spin-off specialising in perovskite photovoltaics and solar cells.

== History ==
The company was founded in 2010 by Henry Snaith and Kevin Arthur. As of 2019 the company has raised $100 Million in investment with support from Oxford University Innovation, Goldwind the University of Oxford, Innovate UK the European Investment Bank (EIB), Legal & General, the Engineering and Physical Sciences Research Council (EPSRC) and Equinor. The largest shareholder is the Swiss cell and module production equipment manufacturer Meyer Burger.

In January 2024, they set a new record of 25% efficiency from industrial sized solar modules. In June 2024, they set another new world record for residential solar panels achieving a 26.9% efficiency from perovskite-on-silicon tandem solar cells. This will allow consumers benefit from upwards of 20% more power from the same footprint.

== Operation ==
The company exploits solid-state physics using metal halide high efficiency perovskite solar cells and was among MIT Technology Review’s top 50 most innovative companies of 2017. Oxford PV is headquartered in Yarnton, Oxfordshire with an industrial pilot line in Brandenburg an der Havel, near Berlin, Germany.
