= Light soaking =

Light soaking refers to the change in power output of solar cells which can be measured after illumination. This can either be an increase or decrease, depending on the type of solar cell. The cause of this effect and the consequences on efficiency varies per type of solar cell. Light soaking can generally cause either metastable electrical or structural effects. Electrical effects can vary the efficiency depending on illumination, electrical bias and temperature, where structural effects actually changes the structure of the material and performance is often permanently altered.

Although in many cases light soaking actually increases the efficiency of the solar cell, the effect is still seen as problematic since stability in power output is an important requirement for solar cells and the devices connected to solar cells. Also, in order to accurately determine the lifetime of solar cells, it is important to know how the cells are affected by light soaking over time.

== Observations ==
In solar cells, the current-voltage (I-V) characteristic curve gives information of its electrical properties. From this relation we can find the fill factor of a solar cell, which essentially tells us its efficiency. Light soaking effects can often be observed in these I-V curves. In solar cells which increase in efficiency due to light soaking a typical deformation (often referred to as an S or kink shape) is seen in the I-V curve before illumination. After illumination during some period, the short-circuit current density and open-circuit voltage go up resulting in a higher fill factor. For solar cells where the light soaking effect is metastable, this change in the I-V curve is reversible either by storage in dark surroundings or electrical bias. In solar cells where the light soaking effects are permanent (often due to structural degradation), the changes in performance are also permanent.

== Commercial thin film technologies ==
Thin film solar cells are commercially used in several technologies. There are three main types of thin film modules, including cadmium telluride (CdTe), copper indium gallium diselenide (CIGS), and amorphous thin-film silicon. All types show changes in device performance under extended duration of light exposure.

=== Amorphous silicon solar (a-Si) cells ===
In a-Si cells, amorphous silicon is used as the semiconductor material. A-Si solar cells show a light induced effect in which its efficiency is degraded by ~10-30% in the first several hundreds of hours of exposure. This effect is known as the Staebler-Wronski effect (SWE) and occurs due to breaking of weak Si-Si bonds. A hole can get trapped in a Si-Si bond adjacent to a Si-H bond after which electron-hole recombination takes place at the Si-Si bond. The Si-H bond then switches toward the Si-Si bond and loses its semiconducting properties. However, the exact microscopic mechanism of the SWE is not fully understood. Light soaking in a-Si cell do show a recovery in efficiency after heating (up to 50 °C). This also explains the seasonal changes in performance (10-15%).

=== CIS/CIGS solar cells ===
Copper indium selenide (CIG) and copper indium gallium (di)selenide (CIGS) are similar semiconducting materials in CIS/CIGS modules. Light soaking for these types of cells are known to show induced efficiency under illumination and produce a ~5% efficiency improvement after light exposure for periods in the order of hours. The effect in these modules is reversible and relaxation time to the low efficiency state is found to be ~3–16 hours.

The main mechanism behind the effect is caused by the presence of selenide copper (Se-Cu) divacancy defect which come in various configurations. For Fermi levels below a certain value E_{F}^{re} (for CGS this is the valence band maximum energy plus 0.2 eV) the defect acts as a shallow donor and causes a defect level at the conduction band. When the Fermi levels rise above E_{F}^{re}, the configuration of the defect changes into two states: a shallow acceptor and a deep acceptor. As a consequence of these defect levels, a nonuniform charge en and defect distribution is created which are affected by light and hence change various electrical characteristics of the module.

=== CdTe solar cells ===
In CdTe cells, cadmium telluride is used as p-doped semiconducting material together with n-doped cadmium sulfide. How the performance changes due to light soaking in CdTe modules strongly varies depending on the device structure and layer compositions. Experiments on these cells have shown a ~6-8% efficiency increase while another group of modules degraded in efficiency by ~7-15%. A common factor in tests on CdTe modules is the effect of the back-contact metallization for current collection. Especially the presence of copper in this back-contact has a main role in most proposed models for this phenomenon.

Addition of copper in the back contact lowers the back-carries height and thus improves performance. On the other hand, the loss of copper via diffusion through CdTe increases back-carrier height which reduces the power output of the cell. The degradation loss due to diffusing copper is significantly faster under higher temperatures (85-100 °C).

== Emerging thin film technologies ==
Some promising emerging types of solar cells include organic solar cells, Perovskite solar cells and dye sensitized solar cells. These technologies are relatively new and the origin of the light soaking effect is not always well understood.

=== Organic solar cells ===
These solar cells are an example of where the power output increases upon illumination. Where there is a kink shape in the I-V characteristic curve which disappears upon illumination, as mentioned above. There are different views of the origin of the light soaking effect in organic/polymer solar cells.

A way to look at the effect is by suggesting that the kink shape originates from so-called trap states on the indium tin oxide/titanium oxide (ITO/TiO_{x}) interface. Consequently, an energy barrier appears due to the difference in the work function of the ITO and the conduction band edge of the TiO_{x}. Hence electrons accumulate at the ITO/TiO_{x} interface, which leads to the kink shape. Upon irradiation, however, the electron density will increase, filling the trap states. With these trap states filled, the energy barrier will become narrower, resulting in the tunneling of electrons, such that they can be absorbed into the ITO electrode. Decreasing the effect of light soaking would then be done by increasing the carrier density in fabrication, filling the trap states from the start.

A different way to explain the effect is by trap assisted recombination. Since these trap levels (holes that are accumulated at the ITO/TiO_{x} interface) lie somewhere in the band gap between the ITO/TiO_{x} layers, these states increase recombination. This is because successive transmissions, from TiO_{x} to trap level, to ITO, are much more probable than one big energy step, from TiO_{x} to ITO. The effect of illumination is then to lower the work function of the ITO TiO_{x} contact, which increases the built-in potential. This higher potential hinders the build up of holes, lowering the recombination and thus removing the kink shape in the I-V curve. To help with the light soaking problem one would have to modify the cathode contact, to a lower effective work function, or get a material that has a lower work function to begin with

=== Perovskite solar cells ===
Perovskite solar cells are very new and many research in solar cells is focussed on these promising technologies. In these solar cells different effects have been observed after light soaking. Both increases and decreases in device performance have been found. These effects can be reversible as well as permanent. A permanent positive change was found and is sometimes explained by enhanced N-type doping due to an increase in oxygen vacancies, which leads to a higher conductivity and charge extraction rate. One can also observe a reversible positive change which is suggested to be due to trapassisted recombination, similar to the effect in organic solar cells. A reversible negative change proposed to be due to light-activated trap states. This decrease in device performance is quickly reversed when stored in dark surroundings. An attempt to illustrate the full behavior is given by a build-up of positive ions (like vacancies) that lower the charge carrier separation in the solar cell. The concentration of these ions can be lowered upon illumination. This is a quick process, which enhances the device performance. However, after an extended period of light soaking, the ions drift to the surface. Because of trap states at the interface, device performance is increased. The magnitude and duration of the effects depend on the grain sizes and morphology of the solar cells. Ion migration is found to be slower in larger grains and minimizing grain boundaries can reduce the light soaking effect.

=== Dye sensitized ===
In these cells the effect is an increase in device performance, which happens during about 20–30 minutes of illumination. Observations show that the current (I) is increased, where the open circuit voltage (V) stays relatively constant. This likely arises from shallow trap states near the conductionband which are formed under illumination. The redistribution of states in the band gap gives rise to a change in the conduction band edge. This results in an increase in the speed in which free electrons are generated, boosting the injection rate, without deteriorating the open circuit voltage
