= Dye-sensitized solar cell =

Type of thin-film solar cell

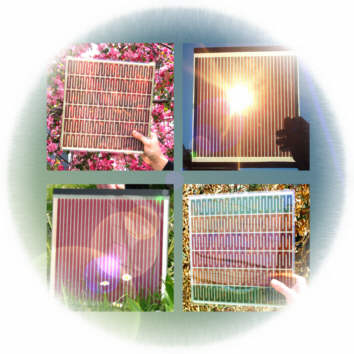
A selection of dye-sensitized solar cells

A dye-sensitized solar cell (DSSC, DSC, DYSC or Grätzel cell) is a low-cost solar cell belonging to the group of thin film solar cells. It is based on a semiconductor formed between a photo-sensitized anode and an electrolyte, a photoelectrochemical system. The modern version of a dye solar cell, also known as the Grätzel cell, was originally co-invented in 1988 by Brian O'Regan and Michael Grätzel at UC Berkeley and this work was later developed by scientists at the École Polytechnique Fédérale de Lausanne (EPFL) until the publication of the first high efficiency DSSC in 1991. Grätzel was awarded the 2010 Millennium Technology Prize for this invention.

The DSSC has a number of attractive features; it is simple to make using conventional roll-printing techniques, is semi-flexible and semi-transparent which offers a variety of uses not applicable to glass-based systems, and most of the materials used are low-cost. In practice it has proven difficult to eliminate a number of expensive materials, notably platinum and ruthenium, and the liquid electrolyte presents a serious challenge to making a cell suitable for use in all weather. Although its conversion efficiency is less than the best thin-film cells, in theory its price/performance ratio should be good enough to allow them to compete with fossil fuel electrical generation by achieving grid parity. Commercial applications, which were held up due to chemical stability problems, had been forecast in the European Union Photovoltaic Roadmap to significantly contribute to renewable electricity generation by 2020.

== Current technology: semiconductor solar cells ==
In a traditional solid-state semiconductor, a solar cell is made from two doped crystals, one doped with n-type impurities (n-type semiconductor), which add additional free conduction band electrons, and the other doped with p-type impurities (p-type semiconductor), which add additional electron holes. When placed in contact, some of the electrons in the n-type portion flow into the p-type to "fill in" the missing electrons, also known as electron holes. Eventually enough electrons will flow across the boundary to equalize the Fermi levels of the two materials. The result is a region at the interface, the p–n junction, where charge carriers are depleted and/or accumulated on each side of the interface. In silicon, this transfer of electrons produces a potential barrier of about 0.6 to 0.7 eV.

When exposed to sunlight, photons from it can excite electrons on the p-type side of the semiconductor, a process known as photoexcitation. In silicon, sunlight can provide enough energy to push an electron out of the lower-energy valence band into the higher-energy conduction band. As the name implies, electrons in the conduction band are free to move about the silicon. When a load is placed across the cell as a whole, these electrons will flow out of the p-type side into the n-type side, lose energy while moving through the external circuit, and then flow back into the p-type material where they can once again re-combine with the valence-band hole they left behind. In this way, sunlight creates an electric current.

In any semiconductor, the band gap means that only photons with that amount of energy, or more, will contribute to producing a current. In the case of silicon, the majority of visible light from red to violet has sufficient energy to make this happen. Unfortunately higher energy photons, those at the blue and violet end of the spectrum, have more than enough energy to cross the band gap; although some of this extra energy is transferred into the electrons, the majority of it is wasted as heat. Another issue is that in order to have a reasonable chance of capturing a photon, the n-type layer has to be fairly thick. This also increases the chance that a freshly ejected electron will meet up with a previously created hole in the material before reaching the p–n junction. These effects produce an upper limit on the efficiency of silicon solar cells, currently around 20% for common modules and up to 27.1% for the best laboratory cells (33.16% is the theoretical maximum efficiency for single band gap solar cells, see Shockley–Queisser limit.).

By far the biggest problem with the conventional approach is cost; solar cells require a relatively thick layer of doped silicon in order to have reasonable photon capture rates, and silicon processing is expensive. There have been a number of different approaches to reduce this cost over the last decade, notably the thin-film approaches, but to date they have seen limited application due to a variety of practical problems. Another line of research has been to dramatically improve efficiency through the multi-junction approach, although these cells are very high cost and suitable only for large commercial deployments. In general terms the types of cells suitable for rooftop deployment have not changed significantly in efficiency, although costs have dropped somewhat due to increased supply.

== Dye-sensitized solar cells ==
Type of cell made at the EPFL by Grätzel and O'Regan

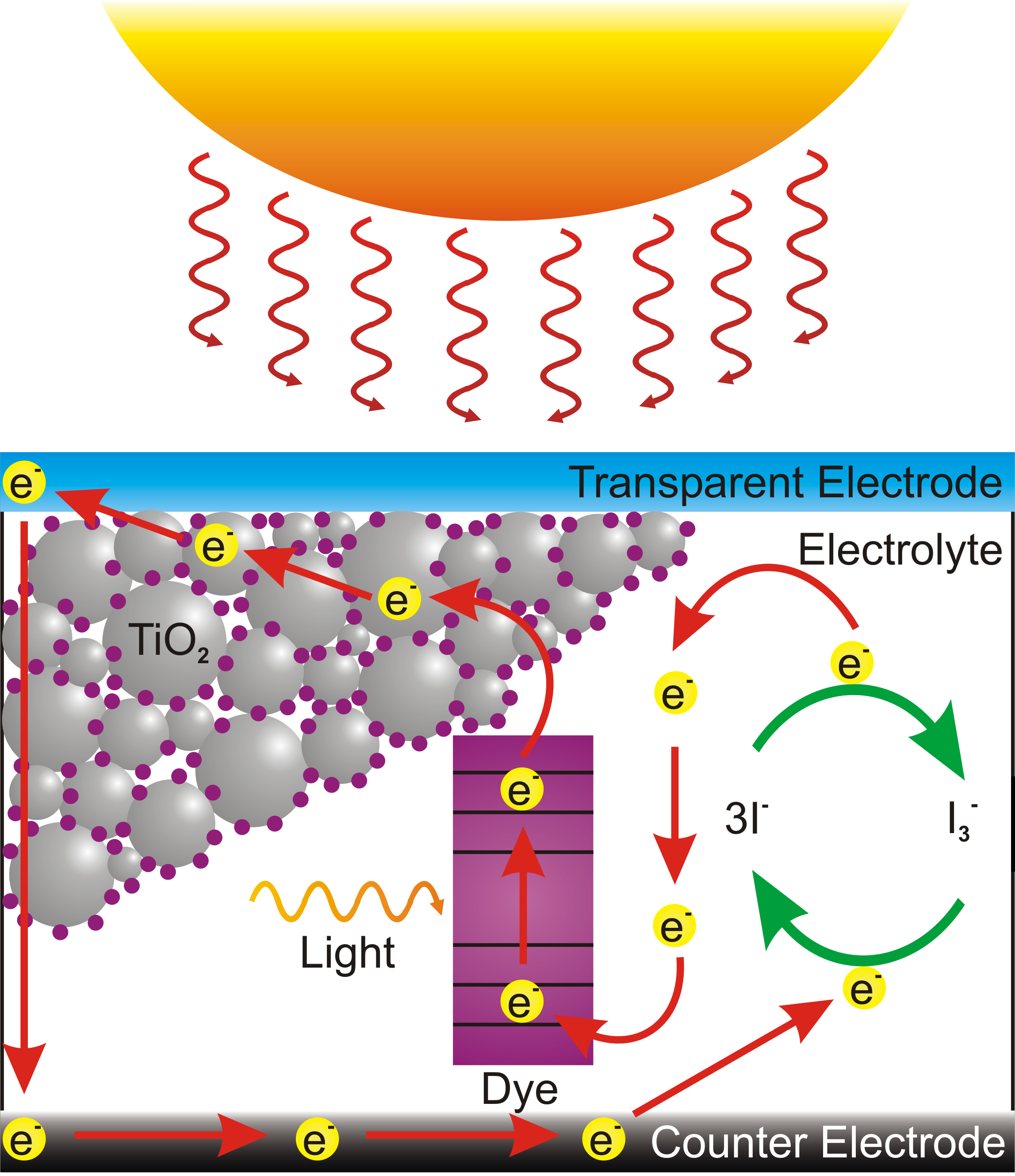
Operation of a Grätzel cell

In the late 1960s it was discovered that illuminated organic dyes can generate electricity at oxide electrodes in electrochemical cells. In an effort to understand and simulate the primary processes in photosynthesis the phenomenon was studied at the University of California at Berkeley with chlorophyll extracted from spinach (bio-mimetic or bionic approach). On the basis of such experiments electric power generation via the dye sensitization solar cell (DSSC) principle was demonstrated and discussed in 1972. The instability of the dye solar cell was identified as a main challenge. Its efficiency could, during the following two decades, be improved by optimizing the porosity of the electrode prepared from fine oxide powder, but the instability remained a problem.

A modern n-type DSSC, the most common type of DSSC, is composed of a porous layer of titanium dioxide nanoparticles, covered with a molecular dye that absorbs sunlight, like the chlorophyll in green leaves. The titanium dioxide is immersed under an electrolyte solution, above which is a platinum-based catalyst. As in a conventional alkaline battery, an anode (the titanium dioxide) and a cathode (the platinum) are placed on either side of a liquid conductor (the electrolyte).

The working principle for n-type DSSCs can be summarized into a few basic steps. Sunlight passes through the transparent electrode into the dye layer where it can excite electrons that then flow into the conduction band of the n-type semiconductor, typically titanium dioxide. The electrons from titanium dioxide then flow toward the transparent electrode where they are collected for powering a load. After flowing through the external circuit, they are re-introduced into the cell on a metal electrode on the back, also known as the counter electrode, and flow into the electrolyte. The electrolyte then transports the electrons back to the dye molecules and regenerates the oxidized dye.

The basic working principle above, is similar in a p-type DSSC, where the dye-sensitised semiconductor is of p-type nature (typically nickel oxide). However, instead of injecting an electron into the semiconductor, in a p-type DSSC, a hole flows from the dye into the valence band of the p-type semiconductor.

Dye-sensitized solar cells separate the two functions provided by silicon in a traditional cell design. Normally the silicon acts as both the source of photoelectrons, as well as providing the electric field to separate the charges and create a current. In the dye-sensitized solar cell, the bulk of the semiconductor is used solely for charge transport, the photoelectrons are provided from a separate photosensitive dye. Charge separation occurs at the surfaces between the dye, semiconductor and electrolyte.

The dye molecules are quite small (nanometer sized), so in order to capture a reasonable amount of the incoming light the layer of dye molecules needs to be made fairly thick, much thicker than the molecules themselves. To address this problem, a nanomaterial is used as a scaffold to hold large numbers of the dye molecules in a 3-D matrix, increasing the number of molecules for any given surface area of cell. In existing designs, this scaffolding is provided by the semiconductor material, which serves double-duty.

=== Counter electrode materials ===
One of the most important components of DSSC is the counter electrode. As stated before, the counter electrode is responsible for collecting electrons from the external circuit and introducing them back into the electrolyte to catalyze the reduction reaction of the redox shuttle, generally I_{3}^{−} to I^{−}. Thus, it is important for the counter electrode to not only have high electron conductivity and diffusive ability, but also electrochemical stability, high catalytic activity and appropriate band structure. The most common counter electrode material currently used is platinum in DSSCs, but is not sustainable owing to its high costs and scarce resources. Thus, much research has been focused towards discovering new hybrid and doped materials that can replace platinum with comparable or superior electrocatalytic performance. One such category being widely studied includes chalcogen compounds of cobalt, nickel, and iron (CCNI), particularly the effects of morphology, stoichiometry, and synergy on the resulting performance. It has been found that in addition to the elemental composition of the material, these three parameters greatly impact the resulting counter electrode efficiency. Of course, there are a variety of other materials currently being researched, such as highly mesoporous carbons, tin-based materials, gold nanostructures, as well as lead-based nanocrystals. However, the following section compiles a variety of ongoing research efforts specifically relating to CCNI towards optimizing the DSSC counter electrode performance.

==== Morphology ====
Even with the same composition, morphology of the nanoparticles that make up the counter electrode play such an integral role in determining the efficiency of the overall photovoltaic. Because a material's electrocatalytic potential is highly dependent on the amount of surface area available to facilitate the diffusion and reduction of the redox species, numerous research efforts have been focused towards understanding and optimizing the morphology of nanostructures for DSSC counter electrodes.

In 2017, Huang et al. utilized various surfactants in a microemulsion-assisted hydrothermal synthesis of CoSe_{2}/CoSeO_{3} composite crystals to produce nanocubes, nanorods, and nanoparticles. Comparison of these three morphologies revealed that the hybrid composite nanoparticles, due to having the largest electroactive surface area, had the highest power conversion efficiency of 9.27%, even higher than its platinum counterpart. Not only that, the nanoparticle morphology displayed the highest peak current density and smallest potential gap between the anodic and cathodic peak potentials, thus implying the best electrocatalytic ability.

With a similar study but a different system, Du et al. in 2017 determined that the ternary oxide of NiCo_{2}O_{4} had the greatest power conversion efficiency and electrocatalytic ability as nanoflowers when compared to nanorods or nanosheets. Du et al. realized that exploring various growth mechanisms that help to exploit the larger active surface areas of nanoflowers may provide an opening for extending DSSC applications to other fields.

==== Stoichiometry ====
Of course, the composition of the material that is used as the counter electrode is extremely important to creating a working photovoltaic, as the valence and conduction energy bands must overlap with those of the redox electrolyte species to allow for efficient electron exchange.

In 2018, Jin et al. prepared ternary nickel cobalt selenide (Ni_{x}Co_{y}Se) films at various stoichiometric ratios of nickel and cobalt to understand its impact on the resulting cell performance. Nickel and cobalt bimetallic alloys were known to have outstanding electron conduction and stability, so optimizing its stoichiometry would ideally produce a more efficient and stable cell performance than its singly metallic counterparts. Such is the result that Jin et al. found, as Ni_{0.12}Co_{0.80}Se achieved superior power conversion efficiency (8.61%), lower charge transfer impedance, and higher electrocatalytic ability than both its platinum and binary selenide counterparts.

==== Synergy ====
One last area that has been actively studied is the synergy of different materials in promoting superior electroactive performance. Whether through various charge transport material, electrochemical species, or morphologies, exploiting the synergetic relationship between different materials has paved the way for even newer counter electrode materials.

In 2016, Lu et al. mixed nickel cobalt sulfide microparticles with reduced graphene oxide (rGO) nanoflakes to create the counter electrode. Lu et al. discovered not only that the rGO acted as a co-catalyst in accelerating the triiodide reduction, but also that the microparticles and rGO had a synergistic interaction that decreased the charge transfer resistance of the overall system. Although the efficiency of this system was slightly lower than its platinum analog (efficiency of NCS/rGO system: 8.96%; efficiency of Pt system: 9.11%), it provided a platform on which further research can be conducted.

=== Construction ===
In the case of the original Grätzel and O'Regan design, the cell has 3 primary parts. On top is a transparent anode made of fluoride-doped tin dioxide (SnO_{2}:F) deposited on the back of a (typically glass) plate. On the back of this conductive plate is a thin layer of titanium dioxide (TiO_{2}), which forms into a highly porous structure with an extremely high surface area. The (TiO_{2}) is chemically bound by a process called sintering. TiO_{2} only absorbs a small fraction of the solar photons (those in the UV). The plate is then immersed in a mixture of a photosensitive ruthenium-polypyridyl dye (also called molecular sensitizers) and a solvent. After soaking the film in the dye solution, a thin layer of the dye is left covalently bonded to the surface of the TiO_{2}. The bond is either an ester, chelating, or bidentate bridging linkage.

A separate plate is then made with a thin layer of the iodide electrolyte spread over a conductive sheet, typically platinum metal. The two plates are then joined and sealed together to prevent the electrolyte from leaking. The construction is simple enough that there are hobby kits available to hand-construct them. Although they use a number of "advanced" materials, these are inexpensive compared to the silicon needed for normal cells because they require no expensive manufacturing steps. TiO_{2}, for instance, is already widely used as a paint base.

One of the efficient DSSCs devices uses ruthenium-based molecular dye, e.g. [Ru(4,4'-dicarboxy-2,2'-bipyridine)_{2}(NCS)_{2}] (N3), that is bound to a photoanode via carboxylate moieties. The photoanode consists of 12 μm thick film of transparent 10–20 nm diameter TiO_{2} nanoparticles covered with a 4 μm thick film of much larger (400 nm diameter) particles that scatter photons back into the transparent film. The excited dye rapidly injects an electron into the TiO_{2} after light absorption. The injected electron diffuses through the sintered particle network to be collected at the front side transparent conducting oxide (TCO) electrode, while the dye is regenerated via reduction by a redox shuttle, I_{3}^{−}/I^{−}, dissolved in a solution. Diffusion of the oxidized form of the shuttle to the counter electrode completes the circuit.

=== Mechanism of DSSCs ===
The following steps convert in a conventional n-type DSSC photons (light) to current:

1. The incident photon is absorbed by the photosensitizer (eg. Ru complex) adsorbed on the TiO_{2} surface.
2. The photosensitizers are excited from the ground state (S) to the excited state (S^{∗}). The excited electrons are injected into the conduction band of the TiO_{2} electrode. This results in the oxidation of the photosensitizer (S^{+}).
  S + hν → S^{∗}	1
  $\ce{S^. ->[\ce{TiO2}] {S+} + e-}$	2
3. The injected electrons in the conduction band of TiO_{2} are transported between TiO_{2} nanoparticles with diffusion toward the back contact (TCO). And the electrons finally reach the counter electrode through the circuit.
4. The oxidized photosensitizer (S^{+}) accepts electrons from the redox mediator, typically I^{−} ion redox mediator, leading to regeneration of the ground state (S), and two I^{−}-Ions are oxidized to elementary Iodine which reacts with I^{−} to the oxidized state, I_{3}^{−}.
  S^{+} + e^{−} → S	3
5. The oxidized redox mediator, I_{3}^{−}, diffuses toward the counter electrode and then it is reduced to I^{−} ions.
  I_{3}^{−} + 2 e^{−} → 3 I^{−}	4

The efficiency of a DSSC depends on four energy levels of the component: the excited state (approximately LUMO) and the ground state (HOMO) of the photosensitizer, the Fermi level of the TiO_{2} electrode and the redox potential of the mediator (I^{−}/I_{3}^{−}) in the electrolyte.

=== Nanoplant-like morphology ===
In DSSC, electrodes consisted of sintered semiconducting nanoparticles, mainly TiO_{2} or ZnO. These nanoparticle DSSCs rely on trap-limited diffusion through the semiconductor nanoparticles for the electron transport. This limits the device efficiency since it is a slow transport mechanism. Recombination is more likely to occur at longer wavelengths of radiation. Moreover, sintering of nanoparticles requires a high temperature of about 450 °C, which restricts the fabrication of these cells to robust, rigid solid substrates. It has been proven that there is an increase in the efficiency of DSSC, if the sintered nanoparticle electrode is replaced by a specially designed electrode possessing an exotic 'nanoplant-like' morphology.

=== Operation ===
In a conventional n-type DSSC, sunlight enters the cell through the transparent SnO_{2}:F top contact, striking the dye on the surface of the TiO_{2}. Photons striking the dye with enough energy to be absorbed create an excited state of the dye, from which an electron can be "injected" directly into the conduction band of the TiO_{2}. From there it moves by diffusion (as a result of an electron concentration gradient) to the clear anode on top.

Meanwhile, the dye molecule has lost an electron and the molecule will decompose if another electron is not provided. The dye strips one from iodide in electrolyte below the TiO_{2}, oxidizing it into triiodide. This reaction occurs quite quickly compared to the time that it takes for the injected electron to recombine with the oxidized dye molecule, preventing this recombination reaction that would effectively short-circuit the solar cell.

The triiodide then recovers its missing electron by mechanically diffusing to the bottom of the cell, where the counter electrode re-introduces the electrons after flowing through the external circuit.

=== Efficiency ===
Several important measures are used to characterize solar cells. The most obvious is the total amount of electrical power produced for a given amount of solar power shining on the cell. Expressed as a percentage, this is known as the solar conversion efficiency. Electrical power is the product of current and voltage, so the maximum values for these measurements are important as well, J_{sc} and V_{oc} respectively. Finally, in order to understand the underlying physics, the "quantum efficiency" is used to compare the chance that one photon (of a particular energy) will create one electron.

In quantum efficiency terms, DSSCs are extremely efficient. Due to their "depth" in the nanostructure there is a very high chance that a photon will be absorbed, and the dyes are very effective at converting them to electrons. Most of the small losses that do exist in DSSC's are due to conduction losses in the TiO_{2} and the clear electrode, or optical losses in the front electrode. The overall quantum efficiency for green light is about 90%, with the "lost" 10% being largely accounted for by the optical losses in the top electrode. The quantum efficiency of traditional designs vary, depending on their thickness, but are about the same as the DSSC.

In theory, the maximum voltage generated by such a cell is simply the difference between the (quasi-)Fermi level of the TiO_{2} and the redox potential of the electrolyte, about 0.7 V under solar illumination conditions (V_{oc}). That is, if an illuminated DSSC is connected to a voltmeter in an "open circuit", it would read about 0.7 V. In terms of voltage, DSSCs offer slightly higher V_{oc} than silicon, about 0.7 V compared to 0.6 V. This is a fairly small difference, so real-world differences are dominated by current production, J_{sc}.

Although the dye is highly efficient at converting absorbed photons into free electrons in the TiO_{2}, only photons absorbed by the dye ultimately produce current. The rate of photon absorption depends upon the absorption spectrum of the sensitized TiO_{2} layer and upon the solar flux spectrum. The overlap between these two spectra determines the maximum possible photocurrent. Typically used dye molecules generally have poorer absorption in the red part of the spectrum compared to silicon, which means that fewer of the photons in sunlight are usable for current generation. These factors limit the current generated by a DSSC, for comparison, a traditional silicon-based solar cell offers about 35 mA/cm^{2}, whereas current DSSCs offer about 20 mA/cm^{2}.

Overall peak power conversion efficiency for current DSSCs is about 11%. Current record for prototypes lies at 15%.

=== Degradation ===
DSSCs degrade when exposed to light. In 2014 air infiltration of the commonly used amorphous Spiro-MeOTAD hole-transport layer was identified as the primary cause of the degradation, rather than oxidation. The damage could be avoided by the addition of an appropriate barrier.

The barrier layer may include UV stabilizers and/or UV absorbing luminescent chromophores (which emit at longer wavelengths which may be reabsorbed by the dye) and antioxidants to protect and improve the efficiency of the cell.

=== Advantages ===
DSSCs are currently the most efficient third-generation (2005 Basic Research Solar Energy Utilization 16) solar technology available. Other thin-film technologies are typically between 5% and 13%, and traditional low-cost commercial silicon panels operate between 14% and 17%. This makes DSSCs attractive as a replacement for existing technologies in "low density" applications like rooftop solar collectors, where the mechanical robustness and light weight of the glass-less collector is a major advantage. They may not be as attractive for large-scale deployments where higher-cost higher-efficiency cells are more viable, but even small increases in the DSSC conversion efficiency might make them suitable for some of these roles as well.

There is another area where DSSCs are particularly attractive. The process of injecting an electron directly into the TiO_{2} is qualitatively different from that occurring in a traditional cell, where the electron is "promoted" within the original crystal. In theory, given low rates of production, the high-energy electron in the silicon could re-combine with its own hole, giving off a photon (or other form of energy) which does not result in current being generated. Although this particular case may not be common, it is fairly easy for an electron generated by another atom to combine with a hole left behind in a previous photoexcitation.

In comparison, the injection process used in the DSSC does not introduce a hole in the TiO_{2}, only an extra electron. Although it is energetically possible for the electron to recombine back into the dye, the rate at which this occurs is quite slow compared to the rate that the dye regains an electron from the surrounding electrolyte. Recombination directly from the TiO_{2} to species in the electrolyte is also possible although, again, for optimized devices this reaction is rather slow. On the contrary, electron transfer from the platinum coated electrode to species in the electrolyte is necessarily very fast.

As a result of these favorable "differential kinetics", DSSCs work even in low-light conditions. DSSCs are therefore able to work under cloudy skies and non-direct sunlight, whereas traditional designs would suffer a "cutout" at some lower limit of illumination, when charge carrier mobility is low and recombination becomes a major issue. The cutoff is so low they are even being proposed for indoor use, collecting energy for small devices from the lights in the house.

A practical advantage which DSSCs share with most thin-film technologies, is that the cell's mechanical robustness indirectly leads to higher efficiencies at higher temperatures. In any semiconductor, increasing temperature will promote some electrons into the conduction band "mechanically". The fragility of traditional silicon cells requires them to be protected from the elements, typically by encasing them in a glass box similar to a greenhouse, with a metal backing for strength. Such systems suffer noticeable decreases in efficiency as the cells heat up internally. DSSCs are normally built with only a thin layer of conductive plastic on the front layer, allowing them to radiate away heat much easier, and therefore operate at lower internal temperatures.

=== Disadvantages ===
The major disadvantage to the DSSC design is the use of the liquid electrolyte, which has temperature stability problems. At low temperatures the electrolyte can freeze, halting power production and potentially leading to physical damage. Higher temperatures cause the liquid to expand, making sealing the panels a serious problem. Another disadvantage is that costly ruthenium (dye), platinum (catalyst) and conducting glass or plastic (contact) are needed to produce a DSSC. A third major drawback is that the electrolyte solution contains volatile organic compounds (or VOC's), solvents which must be carefully sealed as they are hazardous to human health and the environment. This, along with the fact that the solvents permeate plastics, has precluded large-scale outdoor application and integration into flexible structure.

Replacing the liquid electrolyte with a solid has been a major ongoing field of research. Recent experiments using solidified melted salts have shown some promise, but currently suffer from higher degradation during continued operation, and are not flexible.

=== Photocathodes and tandem cells ===
Dye sensitised solar cells operate as a photoanode (n-DSC), where photocurrent result from electron injection by the sensitized dye. Photocathodes (p-DSCs) operate in an inverse mode compared to the conventional n-DSC, where dye-excitation is followed by rapid electron transfer from a p-type semiconductor to the dye (dye-sensitized hole injection, instead of electron injection). Such p-DSCs and n-DSCs can be combined to construct tandem solar cells (pn-DSCs) and the theoretical efficiency of tandem DSCs is well beyond that of single-junction DSCs.

A standard tandem cell consists of one n-DSC and one p-DSC in a simple sandwich configuration with an intermediate electrolyte layer. n-DSC and p-DSC are connected in series, which implies that the resulting photocurrent will be controlled by the weakest photoelectrode, whereas photovoltages are additive. Thus, photocurrent matching is very important for the construction of highly efficient tandem pn-DSCs. However, unlike n-DSCs, fast charge recombination following dye-sensitized hole injection usually resulted in low photocurrents in p-DSC and thus hampered the efficiency of the overall device.

Researchers have found that using dyes comprising a perylenemonoimide (PMI) as the acceptor and an oligothiophene coupled to triphenylamine as the donor greatly improve the performance of p-DSC by reducing charge recombination rate following dye-sensitized hole injection. The researchers constructed a tandem DSC device with NiO on the p-DSC side and TiO_{2} on the n-DSC side. Photocurrent matching was achieved through adjustment of NiO and TiO_{2} film thicknesses to control the optical absorptions and therefore match the photocurrents of both electrodes. The energy conversion efficiency of the device is 1.91%, which exceeds the efficiency of its individual components, but is still much lower than that of high performance n-DSC devices (6%–11%). The results are still promising since the tandem DSC was in itself rudimentary. The dramatic improvement in performance in p-DSC can eventually lead to tandem devices with much greater efficiency than lone n-DSCs.

As previously mentioned, using a solid-state electrolyte has several advantages over a liquid system (such as no leakage and faster charge transport), which has also been realised for dye-sensitised photocathodes. Using electron transporting materials such as PCBM, TiO_{2} and ZnO instead of the conventional liquid redox couple electrolyte, researchers have managed to fabricate solid state p-DSCs (p-ssDSCs), aiming for solid state tandem dye sensitized solar cells, which have the potential to achieve much greater photovoltages than a liquid tandem device.

== Development ==
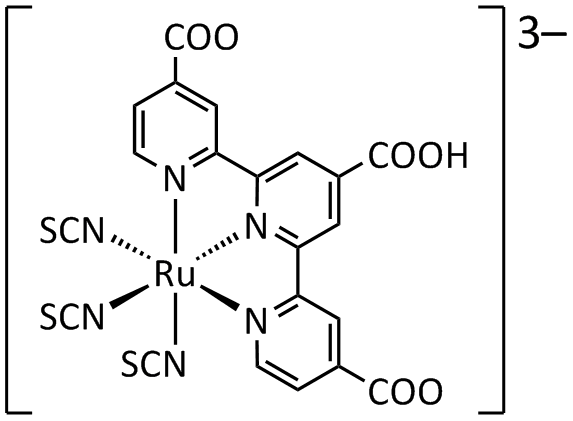
"Black Dye", an anionic Ru-terpyridine complex

The dyes used in early experimental cells (circa 1995) were sensitive only in the high-frequency end of the solar spectrum, in the UV and blue. Newer versions were quickly introduced (circa 1999) that had much wider frequency response, notably "triscarboxy-ruthenium terpyridine" [Ru(4,4',4"-(COOH)_{3}-terpy)(NCS)_{3}], which is efficient right into the low-frequency range of red and IR light. The wide spectral response results in the dye having a deep brown-black color, and is referred to simply as "black dye". The dyes have an excellent chance of converting a photon into an electron, originally around 80% but improving to almost perfect conversion in more recent dyes, the overall efficiency is about 90%, with the "lost" 10% being largely accounted for by the optical losses in top electrode.

A solar cell must be capable of producing electricity for at least twenty years, without a significant decrease in efficiency (life span). The "black dye" system was subjected to 50 million cycles, the equivalent of ten years' exposure to the sun in Switzerland. No discernible performance decrease was observed. However the dye is subject to breakdown in high-light situations. Over the last decade an extensive research program has been carried out to address these concerns. The newer dyes included 1-ethyl-3 methylimidazolium tetrocyanoborate [EMIB(CN)_{4}] which is extremely light- and temperature-stable, copper-diselenium [Cu(In,GA)Se_{2}] which offers higher conversion efficiencies, and others with varying special-purpose properties.

DSSCs are still at the start of their development cycle. Efficiency gains are possible and have recently started more widespread study. These include the use of quantum dots for conversion of higher-energy (higher frequency) light into multiple electrons, using solid-state electrolytes for better temperature response, and changing the doping of the TiO_{2} to better match it with the electrolyte being used.

=== New developments ===
==== 2003 ====
A group of researchers at the École Polytechnique Fédérale de Lausanne (EPFL) has reportedly increased the thermostability of DSC by using amphiphilic ruthenium sensitizer in conjunction with quasi-solid-state gel electrolyte. The stability of the device matches that of a conventional inorganic silicon-based solar cell. The cell sustained heating for 1,000 h at 80 °C.

The group has previously prepared a ruthenium amphiphilic dye Z-907 (cis-Ru(H_{2}dcbpy)(dnbpy)(NCS)_{2}, where the ligand H_{2}dcbpy is 4,4′-dicarboxylic acid-2,2′-bipyridine and dnbpy is 4,4′-dinonyl-2,2′-bipyridine) to increase dye tolerance to water in the electrolytes. In addition, the group also prepared a quasi-solid-state gel electrolyte with a 3-methoxypropionitrile (MPN)-based liquid electrolyte that was solidified by a photochemically stable fluorine polymer, polyvinylidenefluoride-co-hexafluoropropylene (PVDF-HFP).

The use of the amphiphilic Z-907 dye in conjunction with the polymer gel electrolyte in DSC achieved an energy conversion efficiency of 6.1%. More importantly, the device was stable under thermal stress and soaking with light. The high conversion efficiency of the cell was sustained after heating for 1,000 h at 80 °C, maintaining 94% of its initial value. After accelerated testing in a solar simulator for 1,000 h of light-soaking at 55 °C (100 mW cm^{−2}) the efficiency had decreased by less than 5% for cells covered with an ultraviolet absorbing polymer film. These results are well within the limit for that of traditional inorganic silicon solar cells.

The enhanced performance may arise from a decrease in solvent permeation across the sealant due to the application of the polymer gel electrolyte. The polymer gel electrolyte is quasi-solid at room temperature, and becomes a viscous liquid (viscosity: 4.34 mPa·s) at 80 °C compared with the traditional liquid electrolyte (viscosity: 0.91 mPa·s). The much improved stabilities of the device under both thermal stress and soaking with light has never before been seen in DSCs, and they match the durability criteria applied to solar cells for outdoor use, which makes these devices viable for practical application.

==== 2006 ====
The first successful solid-hybrid dye-sensitized solar cells were reported.

To improve electron transport in these solar cells, while maintaining the high surface area needed for dye adsorption, two researchers have designed alternate semiconductor morphologies, such as arrays of nanowires and a combination of nanowires and nanoparticles, to provide a direct path to the electrode via the semiconductor conduction band. Such structures may provide a means to improve the quantum efficiency of DSSCs in the red region of the spectrum, where their performance is currently limited.

In August 2006, to prove the chemical and thermal robustness of the 1-ethyl-3 methylimidazolium tetracyanoborate solar cell, the researchers subjected the devices to heating at 80 °C in the dark for 1000 hours, followed by light soaking at 60 °C for 1000 hours. After dark heating and light soaking, 90% of the initial photovoltaic efficiency was maintained – the first time such excellent thermal stability has been observed for a liquid electrolyte that exhibits such a high conversion efficiency. Contrary to silicon solar cells, whose performance declines with increasing temperature, the dye-sensitized solar-cell devices were only negligibly influenced when increasing the operating temperature from ambient to 60 °C.

==== 2007 ====
Wayne Campbell at Massey University, New Zealand, has experimented with a wide variety of organic dyes based on porphyrin. In nature, porphyrin is the basic building block of the hemoproteins, which include chlorophyll in plants and hemoglobin in animals. He reports efficiency on the order of 5.6% using these low-cost dyes.

==== 2008 ====
An article published in Nature Materials demonstrated cell efficiencies of 8.2% using a new solvent-free liquid redox electrolyte consisting of a melt of three salts, as an alternative to using organic solvents as an electrolyte solution. Although the efficiency with this electrolyte is less than the 11% being delivered using the existing iodine-based solutions, the team is confident the efficiency can be improved.

==== 2009 ====
A group of researchers at Georgia Tech made dye-sensitized solar cells with a higher effective surface area by wrapping the cells around a quartz optical fiber. The researchers removed the cladding from optical fibers, grew zinc oxide nanowires along the surface, treated them with dye molecules, surrounded the fibers by an electrolyte and a metal film that carries electrons off the fiber. The cells are six times more efficient than a zinc oxide cell with the same surface area. Photons bounce inside the fiber as they travel, so there are more chances to interact with the solar cell and produce more current. These devices only collect light at the tips, but future fiber cells could be made to absorb light along the entire length of the fiber, which would require a coating that is conductive as well as transparent. Max Shtein of the University of Michigan said a sun-tracking system would not be necessary for such cells, and would work on cloudy days when light is diffuse.

==== 2010 ====
Researchers at the École Polytechnique Fédérale de Lausanne and at the Université du Québec à Montréal claim to have overcome two of the DSC's major issues:

- "New molecules" have been created for the electrolyte, resulting in a liquid or gel that is transparent and non-corrosive, which can increase the photovoltage and improve the cell's output and stability.
- At the cathode, platinum was replaced by cobalt sulfide, which is far less expensive, more efficient, more stable and easier to produce in the laboratory.

==== 2011 ====
Dyesol and Tata Steel Europe announced in June the development of the world's largest dye sensitized photovoltaic module, printed onto steel in a continuous line.

Dyesol and CSIRO announced in October a Successful Completion of Second Milestone in Joint Dyesol / CSIRO Project. Dyesol Director Gordon Thompson said, "The materials developed during this joint collaboration have the potential to significantly advance the commercialisation of DSC in a range of applications where performance and stability are essential requirements. Dyesol is extremely encouraged by the breakthroughs in the chemistry allowing the production of the target molecules. This creates a path to the immediate commercial utilisation of these new materials."

Dyesol and Tata Steel Europe announced in November the targeted development of Grid Parity Competitive BIPV solar steel that does not require government subsidised feed in tariffs. TATA-Dyesol "Solar Steel" Roofing is currently being installed on the Sustainable Building Envelope Centre (SBEC) in Shotton, Wales.

==== 2012 ====
Northwestern University researchers announced a solution to a primary problem of DSSCs, that of difficulties in using and containing the liquid electrolyte and the consequent relatively short useful life of the device. This is achieved through the use of nanotechnology and the conversion of the liquid electrolyte to a solid. The current efficiency is about half that of silicon cells, but the cells are lightweight and potentially of much lower cost to produce.

==== 2013 ====
During the last 5–10 years, a new kind of DSSC has been developed – the solid state dye-sensitized solar cell. In this case the liquid electrolyte is replaced by one of several solid hole conducting materials. From 2009 to 2013 the efficiency of Solid State DSSCs has dramatically increased from 4% to 15%. Michael Grätzel announced the fabrication of Solid State DSSCs with 15.0% efficiency, reached by the means of a hybrid perovskite CH_{3}NH_{3}PbI_{3} dye, subsequently deposited from the separated solutions of CH_{3}NH_{3}I and PbI_{2}.

The first architectural integration was demonstrated at EPFL's SwissTech Convention Center in partnership with Romande Energie. The total surface is 300 m^{2}, in 1400 modules of 50 cm x 35 cm. Designed by artists Daniel Schlaepfer and Catherine Bolle.

==== 2018 ====
Researchers have investigated the role of surface plasmon resonances present on gold nanorods in the performance of dye-sensitized solar cells. They found that with an increase nanorod concentration, the light absorption grew linearly; however, charge extraction was also dependent on the concentration. With an optimized concentration, they found that the overall power conversion efficiency improved from 5.31 to 8.86% for Y123 dye-sensitized solar cells.

The synthesis of one-dimensional TiO_{2} nanostructures directly on fluorine-doped tin oxide glass substrates was successful demonstrated via a two-stop solvothermal reaction. Additionally, through a TiO_{2} sol treatment, the performance of the dual TiO_{2} nanowire cells was enhanced, reaching a power conversion efficiency of 7.65%.

Stainless steel based counter-electrodes for DSSCs have been reported which further reduce cost compared to conventional platinum based counter electrode and are suitable for outdoor application.

Researchers from EPFL have advanced the DSSCs based on copper complexes redox electrolytes, which have achieved 13.1% efficiency under standard AM1.5G, 100 mW/cm^{2} conditions and record 32% efficiency under 1000 lux of indoor light.

Researchers from Uppsala University have used n-type semiconductors instead of redox electrolyte to fabricate solid state p-type dye sensitized solar cells.

==== 2021 ====
The field of building-integrated photovoltaics (BIPV) has gained attention from the scientific community due to its potential to reduce pollution and materials and electricity costs, as well as to improve the aesthetics of a building. In recent years, scientists have looked at ways to incorporate DSSC’s in BIPV applications, since the dominant Si-based PV systems in the market have a limited presence in this field due to their energy-intensive manufacturing methods, poor conversion efficiency under low light intensities, and high maintenance requirements. In 2021, a group of researchers from the Silesian University of Technology in Poland developed a DSSC in which the classic glass counter electrode was replaced by an electrode based on a ceramic tile and nickel foil. The motivation for this change was that, despite that glass substrates have resulted in the highest recorded efficiencies for DSSC’s, for BIPV applications like roof tiles or building facades, lighter and more flexible materials are essential. This includes plastic films, metals, steel, or paper, which may also reduce manufacturing costs. The team found that the cell had an efficiency of 4% (close to that of a solar cell with a glass counter electrode), demonstrated the potential for creating building-integrated DSSC’s that are stable and low-cost.

==== 2022 ====
Photosensitizers are dye compounds that absorb the photons from incoming light and eject electrons, producing an electric current that can be used to power a device or a storage unit. According to a new study performed by Michael Grätzel and fellow scientist Anders Hagfeldt, advances in photosensitizers have resulted in a substantial improvement in performance of DSSC’s under solar and ambient light conditions. Another key factor to achieve power-conversion records is cosensitization, due to its ability combine dyes that can absorb light across a wider range of the light spectrum. Cosensitization is a chemical manufacturing method that produces DSSC electrodes containing two or more different dyes with complementary optical absorption capabilities, enabling the use of all available sunlight.

The researchers from Switzerland’s École polytechnique fédérale de Lausanne (EPFL) found that the efficiency to cosensitized solar cells can be raised by the pre-adsorption of a monolayer of hydroxamic acid derivative on a surface of nanocrystalline mesoporous titanium dioxide, which functions as the electron transport mechanism of the electrode. The two photosensitizer molecules used in the study were the organic dye SL9, which served as the primary long wavelength-light harvester, and the dye SL10, which provided an additional absorption peak that compensates the SL9’s inefficient blue light harvesting. It was found that adding this hydroxamic acid layer improved the dye layer’s molecular packing and ordering. This slowed down the adsorption of the sensitizers and augmented their fluorescence quantum yield, improving the power conversion efficiency of the cell.

The DSSC developed by the team showed a record-breaking power conversion efficiency of 15.2% under standard global simulated sunlight and long-term operational stability over 500 hours. In addition, devices with a larger active area exhibited efficiencies of around 30% while maintaining high stability, offering new possibilities for the DSSC field.

== See also ==
- Absorption
- Biohybrid solar cell
- Bronsted
- Chromophore
- Elution
- Luminescent solar concentrator
- Organic solar cell
- Perovskite solar cell
- Photoelectrochemical cell
- Photosensitizer
- Photovoltaics
- Polymer solar cell
- Solar cell
- Solid-state solar cell
- Stationary phase
- Titanium dioxide
