= Heiko Gentzel =

German politician

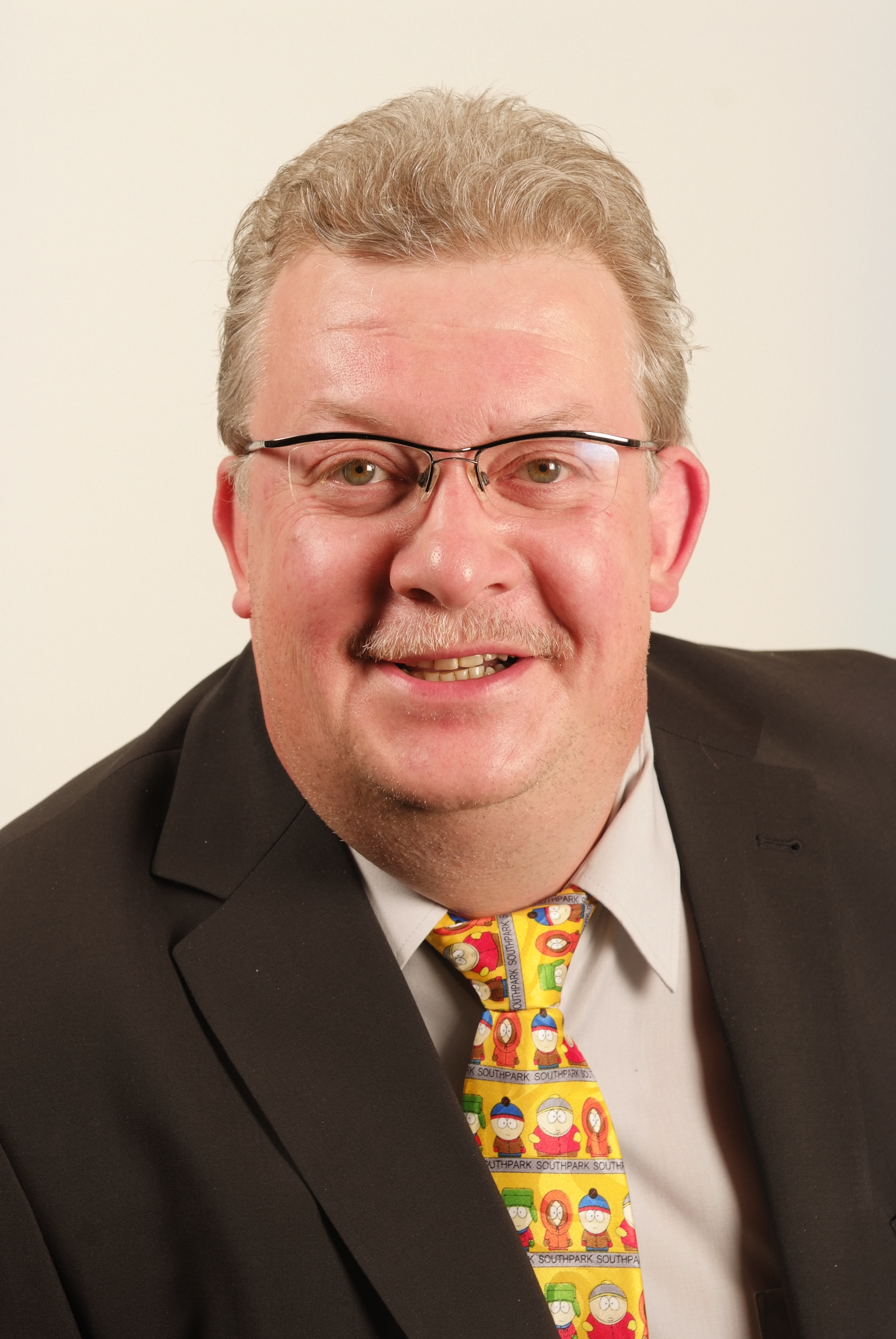
- Gentzel in 2011
- Born: 9 January 1960 (age 66); Erfurt, Thuringia, East Germany
- Political party: SDP (1989-1990); SPD(since 1990)
- Spouse: (divorced)
- Children: 1 son 1 daughter

Heiko Gentzel (born 9 January 1960 in Erfurt) is a German politician (SPD).

Between 1990 and 2014 he was a member of the regional parliament (Landtag) of Thuringia, during which period he served at various times both as vice-president of the parliament and as Chairman of the SPD group in it.

== Life ==
=== Early years ===
Gentzel was born in Thuringia, which was then in the German Democratic Republic (East Germany). His father was a building engineer and his mother was a nurse.

He completed his school education at a Polytechnic Secondary School before undertaking, between 1976 and 1978, an apprenticeship as a fitter, focusing in farm machinery. Military service followed, after which he worked as a machinery repair man working for Kombinat für Landtechnik in Erfurt, and then for Automobilwerk Eisenach, formerly the principal BMW car plant, but by now, following the division of Germany in 1945, known for producing East German Wartburgs.

=== Politics ===
==== in Eisenach ====
In October 1989, as the East German "one-party state" structure began to crumble, Gentzel was a co-founder of the Social Democratic Party (SDP) in Eisenach. Between 1989 and 1990 he represented the party as a member of the "Round table against Abuse of Office and Corruption in the Eisenach district" ("Runden Tisch gegen Amtsmissbrauch und Korruption im Landkreis Eisenach"). He was SPD deputy chairman in Eisenach from 1990 till 1993. Then between 1996 and 2000 he held office as SPD District Chairman in Eisenach, and from 1999 till 2010 he sat on the town council where he was also, from 2004, chairman of the Audit Committee.

==== in the Thuringian Landtag ====
In 1990 Heiko Gentzel became a member of the Thüringer Landtag where he was the SPD spokesman on youth policy between 1990 and 1992. He was the parliamentary business leader from 1992 till 1999 and chairman of the SPD group from 1999 till 2004. Between 2004 and 2014 he was the party's spokesman on domestic policy. On 29 September 2009 he was elected one of the Landtag's four vice-presidents.

=== Retirement ===
As the 2014 Regional election approached, Gentzel announced in September of that year that he had decided against seeking re-election, and was opting for early retirement.
