= Brian O'Regan (chemist) =

American chemist

- Born: Brian C. O'Regan
- Education: UC Berkeley (B.S.), University of Washington (Ph.D.)
- Known for: Dye-sensitized solar cell s
- Scientific career
- Fields: Chemistry
- Workplaces: UC Berkeley; University of Wisconsin; University of Washington; EPFL; ECN; Imperial College London

Brian C. O'Regan is an American chemist known for the co-invention of dye-sensitized solar cells (DSSC, DSC, SSC). He became a Research Lecturer at Imperial College London where he conducted research on photovoltaic cells and other applications of nano-structured oxide electronic materials during the year 2007.

== Major scientific contributions ==
Brian O'Regan is known for his pioneering work on the deposition of meso-porous oxides from colloidal solutions that ultimately led to the first high efficiency DSSC. He has also developed the first high efficiency non-aqueous electrolyte for DSSC and more recently has overturned the belief that water is poisonous to dye sensitisation by designing water based and water tolerant DSSC. He has invented TiO_{2} electrodeposition from TiCl_{3}, electrodeposition of CuSCB and non-aqueous electrodeposition of aligned mesoporous ZnO. He holds 5 patents and is the author of numerous research papers.
