= Gurr =

Gurr is a surname, and may refer to:

- Alan Gurr (born 1982), Australian racecar driver
- Andrew Gurr (born 1936), New Zealand scholar of Shakespeare and English Renaissance theatre
- Andrew Gurr (governor) (born 1944), English politician and colonial administrator
- Bert Gurr (born 1948), American politician from Nevada
- Bob Gurr (born 1931), American amusement ride designer
- Charlotte Gurr (born 1989), English footballer
- Craig Gurr (born 1973), Zimbabwean cricketer
- David Gurr (born 1936), Canadian writer of literary novels and political thrillers
- David Gurr (cricketer) (born 1956), English cricketer
- Donna Gurr (born 1955), Canadian swimmer
- Doug Gurr (born 1964), British businessman
- Elaine Gurr (1896–1996), New Zealand medical doctor and administrator
- Gerry Gurr (born 1946), English football goalkeeper
- Gordon Gurr (1881–1960), Australian rules footballer and cricketer
- Jack Gurr (born 1995), English footballer
- Joshua Gurr (1819–1910), South Australian businessman
- Lena Gurr (1897-1992), American artist
- Malaeoletalu Melesio Gurr, American Samoan politician
- Mark Gurr (born 1966), Zimbabwe tennis player
- Marty Gurr (born 1958), Australian rugby league footballer
- Michael Gurr (1961–2017), Australian actor, playwright and screenwriter
- Sarah Gurr, British plant pathologist and academic
- Ted Robert Gurr (1936–2017), American psychologist and author
- Tom Gurr (1904–1995), Australian journalist and documentary filmmaker

== See also ==
- GURR, German garage band
