= Erin M. Gibson =

Glial and circadian biologist

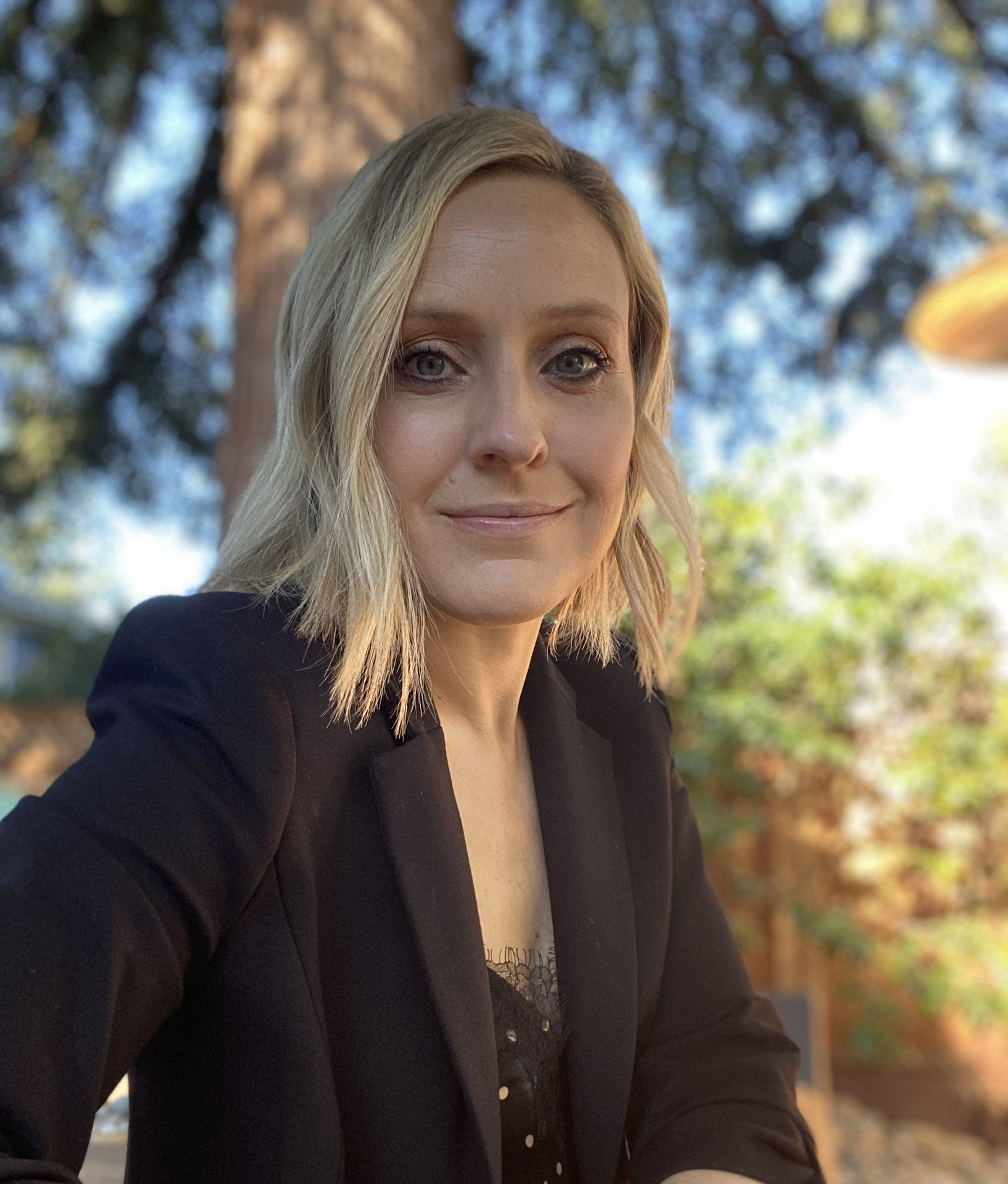
- Born: St. Louis, Missouri, U.S.
- Education: BS Duke University, PhD University of California, Berkeley, postdoctoral work Stanford University
- Known for: Circadian disruptions lead to decreases in hippocampal cell proliferation
- Scientific career
- Fields: Glial biology, circadian biology
- Workplaces: Stanford University

Erin M. Gibson is a glial and circadian biologist as well as an assistant professor in the Department of Psychiatry and Behavioral Sciences and the Stanford Center for Sleep Sciences and Medicine at Stanford University. Gibson investigates the role of glial cells in sculpting neural circuits and mechanistically probes how the circadian rhythm modulates glial biology.

== Early life and education ==
Gibson grew up in St. Louis, Missouri, and attended Whitfield School for her secondary education. Gibson became interested in neuroscience after participating in a research internship at Washington University in St. Louis, an opportunity encouraged by her biology teacher.

=== Graduate work ===
After graduating from high school in 2001, Gibson went on to pursue her undergraduate degree at Duke University where she followed her interests and majored in psychology and neuroscience. As an undergraduate researcher, Gibson worked under Christina Williams in the Department of Psychology and Neuroscience. In Williams' lab, Gibson explored how nutrients and hormones alter brain development and behavior. Gibson graduated from Duke in 2005 with a Bachelors of Science degree. The work that Gibson completed in the Williams laboratory was realized in 2007 when she became second author on a paper in the European Journal of Neuroscience reporting the role of prenatal choline in modulating hippocampal neurogenesis. Her undergraduate work also helped elucidate that prenatal choline supplementation alleviates age-related declines in exploratory behavior in rats.

In 2006, Gibson moved to the West Coast to pursue her graduate studies at the University of California, Berkeley, where she joined the lab of Lance Kriegsfeld to study the role of the circadian system in regulating biological processes.

==== Role of circadian rhythm in regulating ovulatory function ====
Early on in her graduate studies, Gibson published a paper in Endocrinology exploring the mechanisms by which the suprachiasmatic nucleus (SCN) mediates the preovulatory luteinizing hormone (LH) surge in the female reproductive cycle. She discovered a novel mammalian RFamide-related peptide (RFRP) that acted upstream of gonadotropin-releasing hormone (GnRH) to inhibit its release and prevent an LH surge throughout most of the reproductive cycle. They explored the role of the SCN in regulating the cells that release RFRP and they found that when the SCN is active, RFRP releasing cells have decreased activity, and the GnRH system is active. These findings highlight a novel mechanism by which the SCN regulates the LH surge in ovulation through releasing inhibition on the GnRH system. Gibson then later helped write a review on the role of RFRP-3 in regulating GnRH in mammals highlighting the implications of studying circadian biology in the context of reproductive physiology and the neural control of sexual behaviors.

==== Role of circadian rhythm in brain health ====
In 2010, Gibson published a paper highlighting the effects of experimental "jet lag" on adult neurogenesis and cognition. To explore how circadian disruptions affect the brain, Gibson used a technique called experimental jet lag where she introduced phase advances in the light:dark cycle of female hamsters, similar to phase shifts one might experience when traveling to a new time zone. She found that experimental "jet lag" caused pronounced decreases in hippocampal cell proliferation and neurogenesis leading to notable deficits in learning and memory. Although the circadian perturbations disrupted the hypothalamic–pituitary–adrenal axis, the decreases in hippocampal cell proliferation and neurogenesis were not due to cortisol or stress hormones. Further, the negative effects of jet lag on brain health extend beyond the duration of the jet lag itself as hamsters show long lasting decreases in neurogenesis and hippocampal function. Her findings on the effects of circadian disruption on learning and memory highlight the implications of international travel on cognitive function. Her work was highlighted in ABC Science, The Wall Street Journal, NPR and Time. Gibson's thesis, titled "The Role of the Circadian System in Reproductive, Neural, and Immune Health" summarized her experimental findings during her graduate work to emphasize the importance of circadian biology in health and disease.

==== Postdoctoral work ====
After completing her graduate studies in 2011, Gibson pursued her postdoctoral work at Stanford in the lab of Michelle Monje where she studied the effects of neural activity on myelin microstructure in health and disease.

==== Cancer therapy and cognitive dysfunction ====
While modern cancer therapies have provided hope and extended the lives of many patients, major side effects of both cranial radiation and chemotherapeutic agents include deficits in memory, attention, and concentration. Gibson sought to understand how chemotherapy alter the brain by focusing her attention on glial cells, particularly myelin-making glial cells called oligodendrocytes since demyelinating disorder is associated with chemotherapy-related cognitive impairment. Gibson first focused her attention on probing if and how neural activity affects myelin formation in the central nervous system. In 2014, she published a paper in Science showing that increases in neural activity, achieved by optogenetic stimulation, result in robust proliferation of oligodendrocyte precursor cells, which differentiate into oligodendrocytes and increase the thickness of the myelin sheath around neurons. Her results highlight a potential avenue with which to treat demyelinating diseases through the modulation of neural activity. In 2019, Gibson published a paper in Cell probing the dysfunctional glial interactions that give rise to chemotherapy-related cognitive impairment. After developing a mouse model of methotrexate chemotherapy-induced neurological dysfunction, Gibson and her colleagues found decreases in oligodendrocyte precursor cells (OPCs). They later found that methotrexate activates microglia which then activate astrocytes leading to a pro-inflammatory environment which seems to deplete white matter OPCs. By inhibiting microglial activation, Gibson was able to restore OPC levels, showing that microglia could be a target to eliminate the negative effects of chemotherapy on brain homeostasis. In a follow-on paper in Neuron, Gibson and her colleagues showed that the loss of adaptive myelin contributes to the chemotherapy-induced cognitive impairment further emphasizing the importance of targeting the source of OPC depletion in chemotherapy patients.

== Career and research ==
In 2020, Gibson started her independent lab and became an assistant professor at Stanford University in the Department of Psychiatry and Behavioral Sciences, the Stanford Center for Sleep Sciences and Medicine, and Stanford University Medical School. She is also a member of Bio-X at Stanford and the Maternal and Child Health Research Institute. Gibson's lab explores the cellular and molecular mechanisms that modulate glial cells in the central nervous system. Combining her postdoctoral and graduate work, Gibson has a particular interest in how the circadian clock regulates the biology of glial cells in the brain.

== Advocacy ==
Throughout her time in academia, Gibson has been a vocal and fervent advocate for women in science, particularly mothers in scientific careers. Gibson is part of A Working Group of Mothers in Science, started by a professor at the University of California, Davis. The group came together to address the childcare-conference conundrum in which women are less able to attend conference due to the lack of childcare available at these events. Gibson has helped write pieces in Nature Jobs and Nature Careers discussing the matter and how to tackle it by making children and infants welcome at conferences. In 2020, Gibson also wrote a piece in Science addressing the importance of welcoming personal disclosures when institutions and review committees evaluate scientists' curricula vitae. Personal disclosures will help to address the unforeseen life events that might impact ones' research and career trajectory but are often left unaccounted for, only noted as gaps in a scientists' curriculum vitae.

== Select publications ==
- Gibson EM, Nagaraja S, Ocampo A, Tam L, Wood LS, Pallegar PN, Greene JJ, Geraghty AC, Goldstein AK, Ni L, Woo PJ, Barres BA, Liddelow SA, Vogel H, & Monje M (2019). Methotrexate chemotherapy induces persistent tri-glial dysregulation that underlies chemotherapy-related cognitive impairment. Cell, 176, 43–55.
- Gibson EM & Monje M. Emerging mechanistic underpinnings and therapeutic targets for chemotherapy-related cognitive impairment (2019). Current Opinion in Oncology.
- Geraghty AC, Gibson EM, Ghanem RA, Greene JJ, Ocampo A, Goldstein AK, Ni L, Yang T, Marton RM, Pasca SP, Greenberg ME, Longo FM, & Monje M (2019). Loss of adaptive myelination contributes to methotrexate chemotherapy-related cognitive impairment Neuron, 103, 2, 250–265.
- Gibson EM, Geraghty AC, & Monje M (2017). Bad Wrap: Myelin and Myelin Plasticity in Health and Disease. Developmental Neurobiology, 78, 2, 123–135.
- Purger D, Gibson EM, & Monje M (2016). Myelin plasticity in the central nervous system. Neuropharmacology, 110(Pt B), 563–573.
- Venkatesh HS, Johung TB, Caretti V, Noll A, Tang Y, Nagaraja S, Gibson EM, Mount CW, Polepalli J, Mitra SS, Woo PJ, Malenka RC, Vogel H, Bredel M, Mallick P, & Monje M (2015). Neuronal activity-regulated secretion of neuroligin-3 promotes glioma growth. Cell, 161, 803–816.
- Gibson EM, Purger D, Mount CW, Goldstein AK, Lin GL, Wood LS, Inema I, Miller SE, Bieri G, Zuchero JB, Barres BA, Woo PJ, Vogel H, & Monje M (2014). Neuronal activity promotes oligodendrogenesis and adaptive myelination in the mammalian brain. Science, 2014; 344 (6183): 487-?
- Gibson E & Monje M (2012). Effect of cancer therapy on neural stem cells: implications for cognitive function. Current Opinion in Oncology, 24,6.
- Gibson EM, Wang C, Tjho S, Khattar N & Kriegsfeld LJ (2010). Experimental 'jet lag' inhibits adult neurogenesis and produces long-term cognitive deficits in female hamsters. PLOS One, 5,12.
- Gibson EM, Williams WP, & Kriegsfeld LJ (2009). Aging in the circadian system: Considerations for health, disease prevention, and longevity. Experimental Gerontology, 44, 1–2, 51–56.
- Gibson EM, Humber SA, Jain S, Williams WP, Zhao S, Bentley GE, Tsutsui K, & Kriegsfeld LJ (2008). Alterations in RFamide-related peptide expression are coordinated with the preovulatory luteinizing hormone surge. Endocrinology, 149, 10, 4958–4969.
