= Günther K.H. Zupanc =

German-American neurobiologist (born 1958)

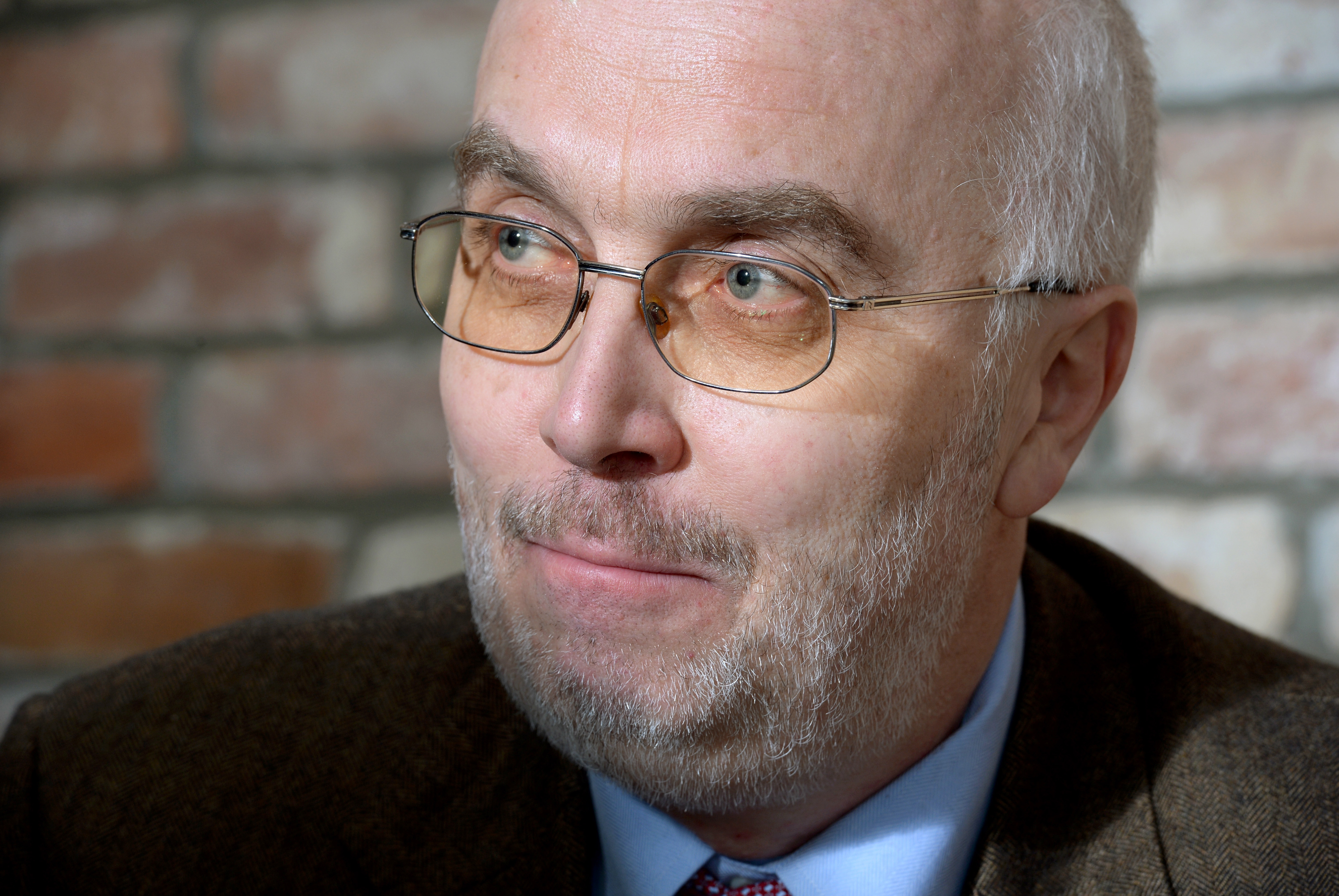
Günther K.H. Zupanc

Günther K.H. Zupanc (born 20 October 1958) is a German-American neurobiologist, researcher, university teacher, book author, journal editor, and educational reformer. He is a Professor in the Department of Biology at Northeastern University in Boston, Massachusetts.

== Education ==
Günther Zupanc was born in Augsburg in (then) West-Germany. He graduated in Biology and Physics from the University of Regensburg (Germany) with degrees equivalent to Bachelor’s and master's degrees. He received his Ph.D. in Neurosciences from the University of California, San Diego (1990), and he was awarded the habilitation (Dr. rer. nat. habil.) in Animal Physiology from the University of Tübingen (Germany) (1995).

== Journalistic career ==
Before enrolling in college, Zupanc worked as a journalist for the Münchner Merkur, a major daily newspaper in Munich, Germany, where he specialized in science writing. He also published numerous science articles in other newspapers and magazines. For one of his articles, he was awarded first prize in the contest Reporter der Wissenschaft as Germany’s best young science writer in 1980.

== Academic career ==
Günther Zupanc was research assistant and research scientist at the Scripps Institution of Oceanography in La Jolla, California (1987–92), junior group leader at the Max Planck Institute for Developmental Biology in Tübingen, Germany (1992–97), senior lecturer (equivalent to associate professor) at the University of Manchester, England (1997–2002), and professor at the International University Bremen (later called Jacobs University Bremen) (2002–09). Since 2009 he has been professor at Northeastern University in Boston, Massachusetts, where he also served as chair of the Department of Biology (2009–12). Zupanc was visiting professor at the University of Ottawa, Canada (1994–97) and visiting scholar at the University of California, San Diego, the University of Chicago, the Max Planck Institute for Behavioral Physiology, the Salk Institute for Biological Studies, the Scripps Research Institute, Tufts University, Jacobs University Bremen, and the University of Virginia.

== Research ==
Zupanc has made important contributions to several disciplines within biology, including neuroethology, neuroanatomy, neuroendocrinology, developmental neurobiology, and computational neuroscience.

In his early work, he showed that seasonal changes in specific behavioral patterns are paralleled by pronounced alterations in the structure of brain neurons that control these behaviors.

His laboratory has extensively studied the behavior of weakly electric fish. Among others, these investigations led to the discovery of a novel behavioral pattern, the 'echo response'.

As part of his efforts to establish the brown ghost knifefish (Apteronotus leptorhynchus) as a powerful model organisms for the study of behavior and neural plasticity, his laboratory performed (in collaboration with the group of Jeffrey N. Agar of the Department of Chemistry and Chemical Biology at Northeastern University) a de novo assembly, annotation, and proteomics validation of the central nervous system transcriptome of this species.

Using the electric organ discharge of weakly electric fish as a neuroethological model system, Zupanc and his team were the first to employ a proteomics approach for large-scale identification of proteins involved in the development of a sexual dimorphism in behavior. The results of this research have implications beyond this study, suggesting that astrocytes play an important role in the regulation of the activity of neural oscillators, including those that control a sexually dimorphic behavior.

In the field of neuroendocrinology, Zupanc and his collaborators succeeded in the cloning and pharmacological characterization of the first non-mammalian somatostatin neuropeptide receptor.

His laboratory developed a novel in vitro technique to trace neural connections in the brain. This approach led to the discovery of numerous previously unknown connections in the brain of teleost fish.

Since the early 1990s, Zupanc’s research group has pioneered the study of adult neurogenesis (the generation of new neurons in the adult central nervous system) in teleosts. He and his wife Marianne M. Zupanc introduced labeling of mitotic cells with 5-bromo-2'-deoxyuridine (BrdU) to research on adult neurogenesis. Since then, this method has been used by numerous investigators working in this area. His research group performed the first complete mapping of proliferation zones in the adult brain of any vertebrate species (1995), and he and his associates introduced zebrafish (2005) and tilapia (2012) as model systems to study adult neurogenesis. To provide an explanation for the biological function of adult neurogenesis, he formulated the 'matching hypothesis.' According to this hypothesis, neurogenesis in the adult central nervous system is the result of the continuous generation of new muscle fibers and sensory receptor cells in the periphery. To maintain a constant ratio between the peripheral motor and sensory elements on the one side, and the central elements on the other, any numerical change in the periphery prompts a corresponding numerical alteration (production or loss of neurons) in the central nervous system.

He and his team also demonstrated that the continued generation of new neurons in the adult central nervous system of teleost fish is closely linked to the enormous potential of this taxon to regenerate nervous tissue and to recover behavioral function after brain lesions and spinal cord injury. By employing a proteomics approach, Zupanc and his associates performed the first large-scale analysis in teleost fish of changes in global protein expression after brain trauma and spinal cord injury. As part of this effort, the team succeeded in the identification of a large number of proteins potentially involved in the regeneration of nervous tissue.

In an expansion of their research on adult neurogenesis, the laboratory of Zupanc discovered the first vertebrate organism that lacks any of the hallmarks of brain senescence common to humans and all mammalian species examined thus far. In contrast to the latter, brown ghost knifefish (Apteronotus leptorhynchus) do not exhibit any significant age-related decline in stem/progenitor cell proliferation, neuronal and glial differentiation, or long-term survival of newly generated cells. The availability of this first vertebrate model of ‘negligible senescence’ provides unprecedented opportunities for a better understanding of the biology of aging and of the cellular mechanisms that protect brains from senescing.

As the first investigator in the field of adult neurogenesis, Zupanc and his laboratory succeeded in generating three-dimensional, high-resolution maps of adult stem cells and their progeny, as well as molecular profiles of these cells, in the spinal cord. This work led to the development of a novel mapping approach (‘statistical mapping’), which enables researchers to produce global maps of central nervous system structures with cellular resolution. By integrating the big data set collected through such experimental work, Zupanc and his collaborators (notably Iulian Ilieş, Dávid Lehotzky, and Rifat Sipahi succeeded in building the first mathematical and computational models of stem-cell-driven tissue growth in the spinal cord during adult development and regeneration. These models provide an important theoretical framework for better understanding tissue growth in the intact and regenerating central nervous system.

In collaboration with Rifat Sipahi, Zupanc also constructed computational models that simulate normal and tumorous tissue growth in vitro. Using this approach, the team has provided a theoretical explanation for the seemingly paradoxical effect that in lymphoma and prostate cancer cell-death-inducing chemotherapy sometimes induces tumors, instead of suppressing them.

As a translational spin-off of the basic research carried out in the laboratory of Günther Zupanc, his group developed a novel in vivo assay for screening and characterizing water-soluble anesthetic compounds.

A characteristic feature of the research of Günther Zupanc is the application of a multidisciplinary approach — the techniques and concepts used in his investigations are taken from a wide range of disciplines, including molecular biology, cell biology, neuroanatomy, neurophysiology, computational neurosciences, behavioral neurobiology, analytical chemistry, biophysics, and mathematical modeling.

== Editor of journals ==
Zupanc was senior editor of the Journal of Zoology (2007–11). After 14 years of serving as associate editor of the Journal of Comparative Physiology A, he became its editor-in-chief in 2022. In this capacity, he is only the fourth chief editor of this journal, which was founded in 1924 by the later Nobel laureate Karl von Frisch. He is also a member of the editorial boards of Regenerative Medicine and Developmental Neurobiology. Zupanc has edited special issues of several scientific journals, including Adult Neurogenesis: A Comparative Approach for Brain, Behavior and Evolution, Electric Fish: Model Systems for Neurobiology and Integrative and Comparative Neurobiology: Papers in Memoriam of Theodore H. Bullock (1915-2005) for Journal of Comparative Physiology A, Towards a Comparative Understanding of Adult Neurogenesis (jointly with Luca Bonfanti and Ferdinando Rossi) for European Journal of Neuroscience, Adult Neural Stem Cells in Development, Regeneration, and Aging (jointly with James Monaghan and David L. Stocum) for Developmental Neurobiology, and Centennial Issue for Journal of Comparative Physiology A.

== Book author ==
Günther K.H. Zupanc published his first book, Fische und ihr Verhalten (1982), while he was still an undergraduate student. This book appeared subsequently in an English edition under the title Fish and Their Behavior and became a bestseller. Zupanc is editor of Praktische Verhaltensbiologie (1988), a laboratory manual used widely in German-speaking countries in biology education. His book Behavioral Neurobiology: An Integrative Approach (2004; third edition: 2019) is the most frequently adopted text in teaching behavioral neurobiology classes in the world. In a review by the journal Integrative and Comparative Biology, it has been praised as “a milestone in the neuroethological literature”.

== Science policy and educational reforms ==
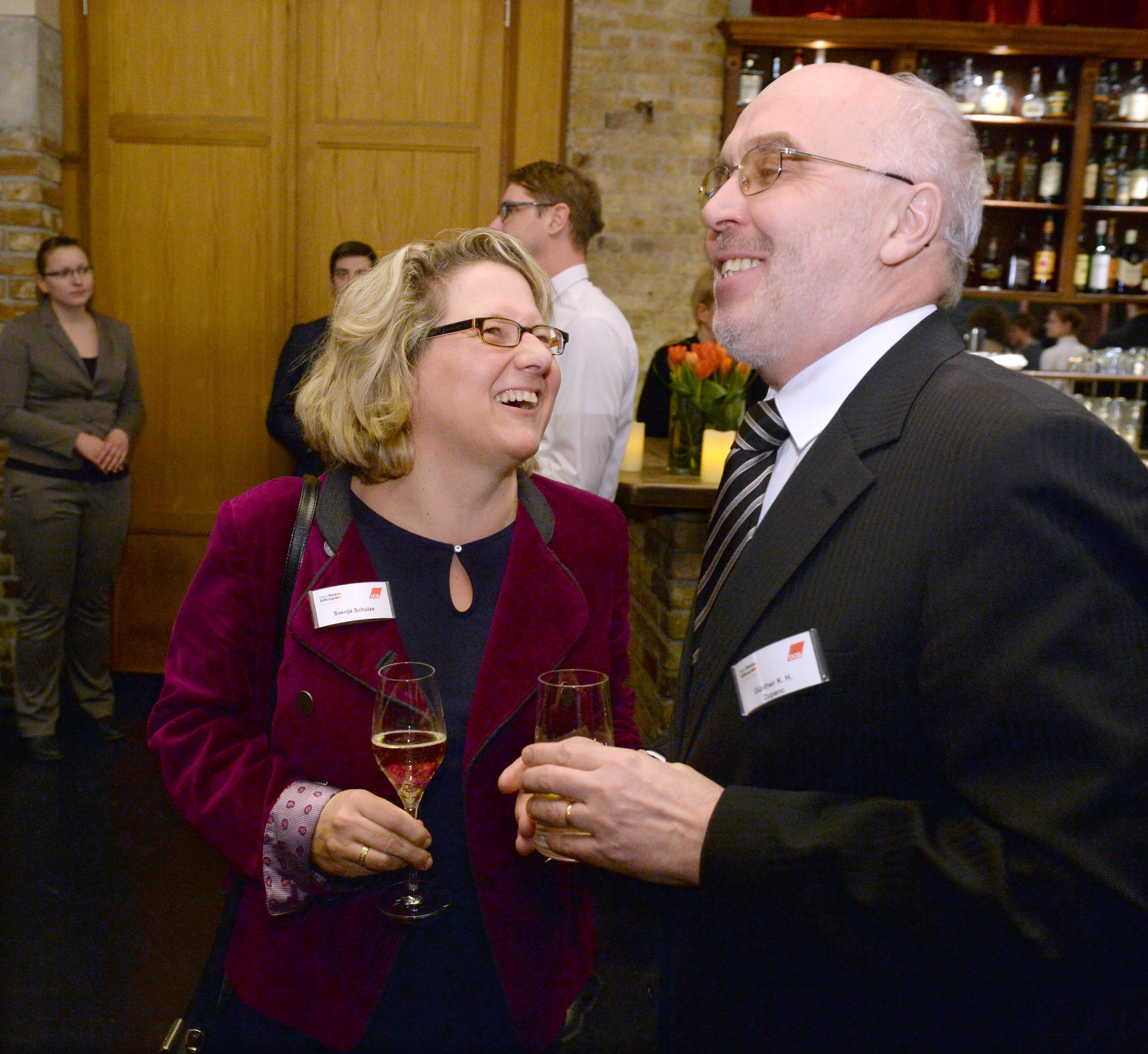
Günther Zupanc with German minister Svenja Schulze in Berlin in 2015

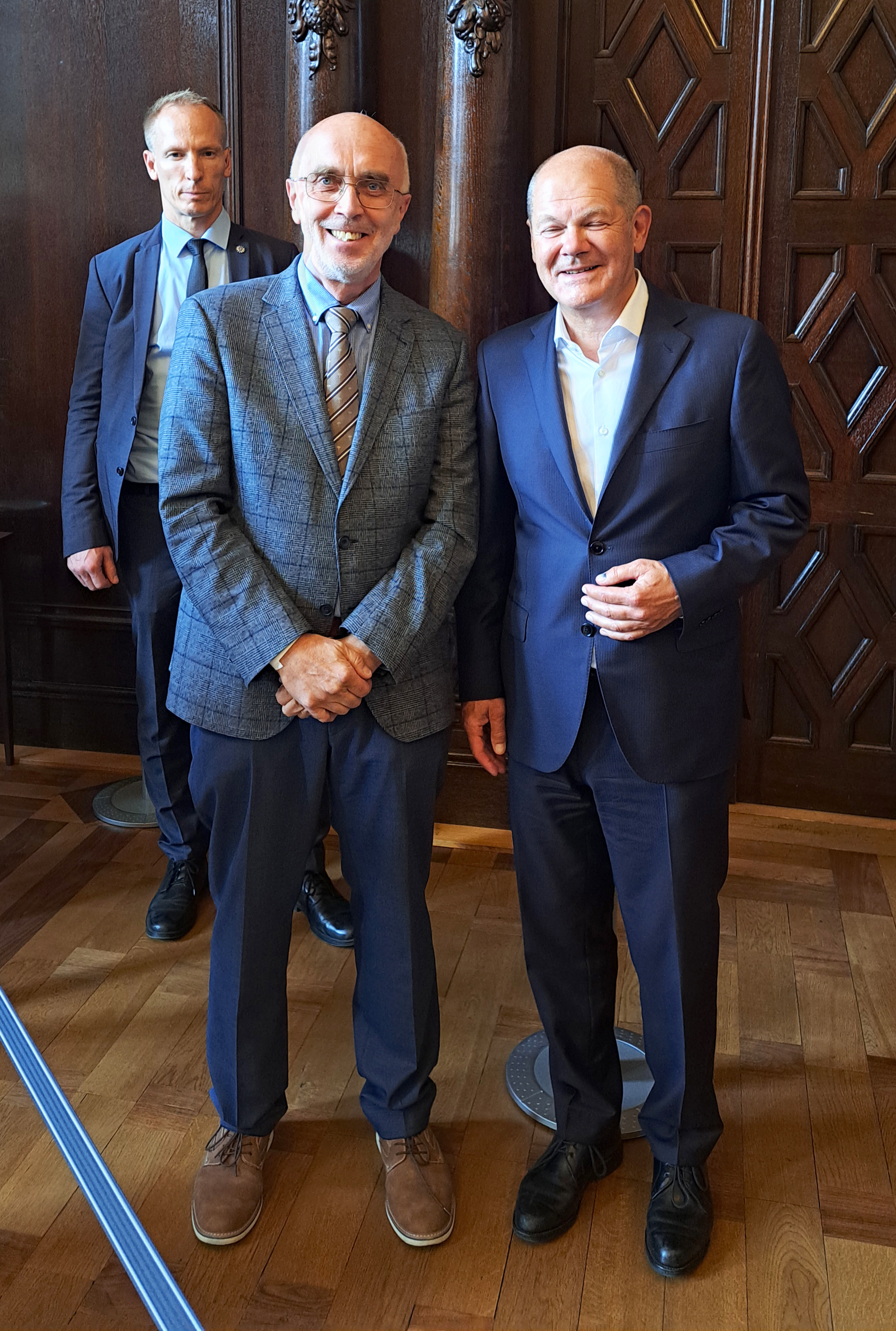
Günther K.H. Zupanc (left) and Olaf Scholz (right), Chancellor of the Federal Republic of Germany, in the city hall of Bremen in 2024

Günther Zupanc was among the founding faculty of the International University Bremen (subsequently Jacobs University Bremen), a unique private international university that combines features of the European Higher Education systems with the U.S. American Higher Education system. He played a leading role in defining and establishing the biology degree program at this institution. In 2009, this program received the top ranking of all universities evaluated by the Center for Higher Education Development (CHE).

Zupanc has published extensively on history of science, as well as various science policy issues, including biology teaching, online education, internationalization of higher education, integration of undergraduate students into research, student fellowships, student debt, privatization of higher education, research assessment, government funding of research, university rankings, ethics of part-time teaching contracts, women in science, collaboration in science, and scientific publishing, including peer review. Zupanc is frequently sought as a speaker and advisor on science and higher education policy.

== Personal life ==
Günther K.H. Zupanc is married to Dr. Marianne M. Zupanc, a microbiologist and high school teacher, with whom he has three children, Frederick, Christina, and Daniel.
