= Rank Prizes =

British award in optoelectronics and nutrition

The Rank Prizes comprise the Rank Prize for Optoelectronics and the Rank Prize for Nutrition. The prizes recognise, reward and encourage researchers working in the respective fields of optoelectronics and nutrition.

The prizes are funded by the charity Rank Prize, which was endowed by the industrialist, philanthropist and founder of the Rank Organisation, J. Arthur Rank and his wife Nell, via the Rank Foundation on 16 February 1972, not long before Arthur's death. Two Funds, the Human and Animal Nutrition and Crop Husbandry Fund and the Optoelectronics Fund, support sciences which reflect Rank's business interests through his "connection with the flour-milling and cinema and electronics industries", and which Rank believed would be of great benefit to humanity.

Rank Prize also recognises, supports and fosters excellence among young and emerging researchers in the two fields of nutrition and optoelectronics. Rank Prize aims to advance and promote education and learning for public benefit.

== Rank Prize for Optoelectronics ==
The Rank Prize for Optoelectronics supports, encourages, and rewards researchers working at the cutting edge of optoelectronics research, initially (from 1976) awarded annually, now a biennial prize worth £100,000. Optoelectronics relates to the interface between optics and electronics, and related phenomena.

The Committee on Optoelectronics consists of the following people:

- Donal Bradley (Chairman)
- Roberto Cipolla
- Martin D. Dawson
- Helen Gleeson
- Anya Hurlbert
- Jonathan Knight
- John Mollon
- Alison Noble
- Miles Padgett

Past winners include:

- 1978 – Charles K. Kao
- 1980 – George Gray
- 1982 – C. Thomas Elliott and Calvin Quate
- 1988 – T. Peter Brody
- 1991 – David N. Payne and William Alexander Gambling
- 1992 – William Newsome and Semir Zeki
- 1993 – Horace W. Babcock and Arthur Ashkin
- 1995 – William Bradshaw Amos, Marvin Minsky and Chuck Hull
- 1997 – Peter Mansfield
- 1998 – Federico Capasso, Isamu Akasaki, Hiroshi Amano and Shuji Nakamura
- 2000 – Winfried Denk and Watt W. Webb
- 2006
  - Charles H. Bennett, Gilles Brassard and Stephen Wiesner (for research on the original concept of quantum cryptography)
  - Paul Alivisatos, M.P. Bruchez, W.C.W. Chan, S.M. Nie, S. Weiss (for realisation of quantum dot nanocrystals as biological labels)
- 2008 – Mandyam Srinivasan and Peter B. Denyer
- 2014 – Alf Adams and Eli Yablonovitch
- 2018 – Jonathan C. Knight, Philip Russell and Tim Birks
- 2022 − Michael Grätzel, Akihiro Kojima, Michael Lee, Tsutomu Miyasaka, Nam-Gyu Park, Sang Il Seok, Henry Snaith
- 2024 − Junzhong Liang, Donald T. Miller, Austin Roorda, David R. Williams
- 2026 − Susumu Noda

== Rank Prize for Nutrition ==
The Rank Prize for Nutrition is for research in human and animal nutrition (distinct from animal husbandry), and crop husbandry.

The Committee on Nutrition consists of the following people:

- John Mathers (Chairman)
- Malcolm Bennett
- Tim George
- Michael Gooding
- Sarah Gurr
- Anne-Marie Minihane
- Susan Ozanne
- Ann Prentice
- John Wilding

The Rank Prize for Nutrition was awarded at various intervals since 1976, but is now also awarded biennially, worth £100,000.

In 2014 Australian biophysicist Graham Farquhar and the CSIRO agronomist Richard Richards were awarded the Rank Prize in Nutrition, for "pioneering the understanding of isotope discrimination in plants and its application to breed wheat varieties that use water more efficiently", which related to a discovery the pair made in the 1980s.

Other winners include:

- 1981 − Hugo Kortschak, Marshall (Hal) Davidson Hatch and Roger Slack, for "outstanding work on the mechanism of photosynthesis which established the existence of an alternative pathway for the initial fixation of carbon dioxide in some important food plants".
- 1982 − Hamish Munro, for his work on the protein metabolism of mammals.
- 1984 − Elsie Widdowson, for her work on the values of foods as nutrient sources, the effects of long-term undernutrition and starvation and the nature and control of the growth process.
- 1989 − Vernon R. Young, for his work on the amino acid metabolism of man.
- 1992 − Kenneth Blaxter, lifetime award given posthumously.
- 1995 – Richard Smithells and B.M. Hibbard, for "pioneering studies into the role of micronutrient deficiencies, principally folic acid deficiency, and neural tube defects".
- 2006 − J.C. van Lenteren, Marcel Dicke, and Louise E.M. Vet for "fundamental studies of plant-pest-natural enemy interactions and the development of practical methods of pest control".
- 2010 − Peter E. Hartmann and Robyn Owens for their "research on human lactation, including methods for the non-invasive measurement of the rate of milk secretion".
- 2020 – Stephen O'Rahilly
- 2022 – Cathie Martin "for outstanding research into plant genetics and metabolism leading to enhanced nutritional qualities of fruits and vegetables".
- 2024 – Mike Lean and Roy Taylor
- 2026 – David E. Salt and Martin Broadley
