= Australasian Science =

- Categories: Science magazine
- Frequency: Monthly
- Founded: 1938
- Final issue: July/August 2019
- Company: Control Publications Pty. Ltd.
- Country: Australia
- Language: English
- Website: www.australasianscience.com.au
- ISSN: 1442-679X

Australasian Science was a bimonthly science magazine published in Australia and was the longest-running scientific publication in the country, from 1938 to 2019. It contained a mixture of news items, feature articles, and expert commentary.

== History ==
Australasian Science was Australia's longest-running scientific publication. It was first published in 1938 as The Australian Journal of Science by the Australian National Research Council, which was the forerunner of the Australian Academy of Science.

In 1954 the journal was transferred to ANZAAS – the Australian and New Zealand Association for the Advancement of Science, and published as Search. Throughout this time the journal published the research of eminent Australian scientists, including Sir Douglas Mawson and Sir Frank Macfarlane Burnet, whose groundbreaking clonal selection theory was published in the journal in 1957.

The journal evolved considerably over the following decades, with ownership transferring from ANZAAS to Blackwell Science in the 1980s and finally to Control Publications in 1992.

In 1998 Search merged with Australasian Science Mag, a quarterly science magazine published by the University of Southern Queensland, and the merged entity was published as simply Australasian Science. Published by Control Publications and available in newsagents, it was the only magazine dedicated to Australian and New Zealand science.

Australasian Science's Patrons in this time were Nobel Laureate Prof Peter C. Doherty and ABC broadcaster Robyn Williams.

Issues Magazine (last issue 2014) merged into Australasian Science.

Australasian Science ceased production following publication of the July/August 2019 edition.

== Description ==
It contained a mixture of news items, feature articles, and expert commentary.

== Australasian Science Prize ==
The Australasian Science Prize was an annual prize awarded across all disciplines of science and medicine each year for excellence in peer-reviewed research. Past winners have included:

- 2007 Paul Fisher (La Trobe University) for discovering that an alarm protein in slime mold could be used to model cellular damage observed in human mitochondrial diseases.
- 2006 Alex Hamilton and the Quantum Electronic Devices Group (University of NSW) for developing quantum semiconductor devices that use holes instead of electrons.
- 2005 Alexander Argyros, Martijn van Eijkelenborg, and Maryanne Large (University of Sydney)for developing polymer optical fibres that perform competitively with silica fibres.
- 2004 Levon Khachigian (UNSW) for developing DNA drugs with potential in cancer treatment.
- 2003 Mark Rowe (UNSW) for determining how sensations are processed and transmitted in the brains of mammals.
- 2002 Mark Hindell (University of Tasmania) for research on the behaviour of southern elephant seals and other marine predators.
- 2001 Mandyam Srinivasan, Shaowu Zhang, and Javaan Chahl (Australian National University) for extending knowledge of the behaviour and intelligence of bees to artificial intelligence.
- 2000 Charlie Veron and Mary Stafford-Smith (Australian Institute of Marine Science) for the discovery of 169 species of corals, and for documenting all known species.

== See also ==
- List of science magazines
