= Mandyam Veerambudi Srinivasan =

Australian bioengineer and neuroscientist

Mandyam Veerambudi Srinivasan AM FRS, also known as "Srini", (born 1948) is an Australian bioengineer and neuroscientist who studies visual systems, particularly those of bees and birds.

A faculty member at the University of Queensland, he is a recipient of the Prime Minister's Prize for Science and a fellow of the Australian Academy of Science and the Royal Society (elected 2001).

== Early life and education ==
Srinivasan was born in Poona, India in 1948. His early interests included making transistor radios with his father. His family moved to Calcutta and Delhi before settling in Bangalore, where Srinivasan completed his schooling from the Bishop Cotton Boys' School in 1962. In tertiary education, he earned a number of degrees in the years following:

- 1967 - Bachelor's degree in electrical engineering, Bangalore University (5-year degree)
- 1970 - Master's degree in applied electronics and servo mechanisms, Indian Institute of Science, Bangalore, India
- 1973 - M.Phil. in engineering and applied science, Yale University
- 1977 - PhD in engineering and applied science, Yale University
- 1994 - DSc in neuroethology, Australian National University

== Career ==
After completing his PhD in the US, Srinivasan moved to Canberra in 1978 to take up a position at the Departments of Neurobiology and Applied Mathematics at the Australian National University (ANU), where he stayed until 1982, when he secured a research position in Zurich, Switzerland, to work on insect behaviour. It was here that he learnt how to train and work with honeybees. In 1985 he returned to the ANU, and set up an interdisciplinary research group which focused on investigating how bees use their vision to navigate and land very precisely.

In 2007, Srinivisan took up a position working at the Queensland Brain Institute and the School of Information Technology and Electrical Engineering of the University of Queensland.

Srinivasan delivered the 12th Lecture organised by the General K.S. Thimayya Memorial Trust.

== Research interests ==
At Yale, Srinivasan did research on movement perception in flies, and became interested in the vision of insects.

Focusing his attention on honey bees, in particular the Western honey bee, Srinivasan has explored how simple animal systems display complex behaviours. This broad field has applications in robotics, especially unmanned aerial vehicles because of the competing needs for autonomy and a lightweight control system.

Bees are highly competent fliers. Srinivasan has shown that many ostensibly complex flight behaviours can be attributed to the tendency of the bee to keep optic flow constant. Some examples:

- They measure the distance they have travelled. This is important as distance is signalled to other bees as a component of the waggle dance.
- When landing, the ground becomes closer and therefore appears to be moving faster. By keeping the apparent velocity of the ground constant, the bee reduces its own velocity in a continuous manner.
- Similarly, bees slow down in a crowded landscape because nearby objects appear to move faster than objects on the horizon. This is a safety mechanism that reduces the incidence of collision.
- When avoiding objects, the bee will tend to take the optimal path because it will 'balance' the rate of the optic flow between the eyes. It will, for example, fly down the middle of a tunnel, because if it flew closer to one side the optic flow would appear to be greater.

Srinivasan's research looks mainly at "vision, perception and cognition in animals with simple nervous systems, and on how these might be used in machine vision and robotics".

== Awards and honours ==
Srinivasan's work has been recognised and honoured by a number of awards and honours, including:

- 1995 - Election to the Fellowship of the Australian Academy of Science (FAA)
- 2001 - Inaugural Australian Federation Fellowship award of the Australian Research Council
- 2001 - Australasian Science Prize (for excellence in peer-reviewed research)
- 2001 - Election to the Fellowship of the Royal Society of London (FRS)
- 2003 - Australian Centenary Medal
- 2006 - Royal Society of New Zealand Distinguished Visitor
- 2006 - Fellowship of the Academy of Sciences for the Developing World
- 2008 - Queensland Smart State Premier's Fellowship
- 2008 - Rank Prize for Optoelectronics (UK)
- 2009 - Distinguished Alumni Award of the Indian Institute of Science
- 2012 - Membership of the Order of Australia (AM)

== Publications ==
As of July 2020, Srinivasan had authored 15 book chapters, 189 journal articles, 69 conference papers, and had registered two patents. The patents were registered with co-authors Javaan Singh Chahl and other researchers: a "novel system for panoramic video surveillance" in 1997, and an imaging system in 2002 (US).

== Criticism ==
In 2020, a PubPeer comment pointed out issues related to undisclosed data re-use for two papers by Srinivasan. Srinivasan published two expressions of concern which confirmed the issues, but also argued that they do not affect the conclusions of the articles.

In 2024, in a non-peer reviewed preprint, allegations of scientific misconduct were made against at least ten of Srinivasan's papers regarding honeybee odometry and navigation, including miscalculations, reuse of images, and manipulation of data. Srinivasan and his colleagues, his critics, and outside experts have discussed the allegations in non-peer reviewed forums. Srinivasan and colleagues have for example pointed out that the critics do not work in the research field, and claimed that the critics themselves made errors in their preprint.

In an editorial in the Journal of Comparative Physiology A, Eric Warrant, the head of the sensory biology division at Lund University discussed the allegations and the process by which they played out. He said that the results of Srinivasan had been since been independently confirmed by other research teams, and maintained that though Srinivasan and colleagues are guilty of mistakes and sloppiness, the results of their work are valid. He particularly decried the manner in which the criticism was levied, which he says gave Srinivasan no time to respond before the claims were posted both on social media and Wikipedia. In a rebuttal also published in the Journal of Comparative Physiology A, Lior Pachter disputes Warrant's allegations, finding numerous inaccuracies and falsehoods in Warrant's editorial, and argues for the importance of truth in the advancement of science. Lior Pachter’s rebuttal has been refuted by Eric Warrant in a subsequent correspondence article [21], also published by the Journal of Comparative Physiology A. Warrant states that the conclusions of his original Editorial article (19) remain unaltered. Lior Pachter’s rebuttal has also been refuted by Mandyam Veerambudi Srinivasan in a subsequent correspondence article [22], also published by the Journal of Comparative Physiology A. Srinivasan states that, even a year after he and his colleagues provided extensive counter arguments [16, 23] to the claims of scientific misconduct made by Luebbert and Pachter in their arXiv preprint [14], Pachter [20] continues to repeat the same allegations in his response to Eric Warrant’s Editorial [19]. A further correspondence article written by Geoffrey Stuart [24], also published by the Journal of Comparative Physiology A, points to major flaws in the statistical simulation models that were used by Laura Luebbert and Lior Pachter to make their claims. A detailed description of these flaws is given in [25]. A complete list of the Editorial and Correspondence articles published by the Journal of Comparative Physiology A on this matter is available at https://link.springer.com/collections/ajgdihfaba. This link provides readers with an equal opportunity to view the allegations, as well the detailed responses to these allegations.

Additional References:

21. Warrant, Eric J. (2025) “My plea for academic decency remains unchanged: a response to Lior Pachter”. Journal of Comparative Physiology A 211 633–635. (https://link.springer.com/article/10.1007/s00359-025-01764-3)

22. Srinivasan, Mandyam V, (2025) “Setting the record straight: a response to Lior Pachter”. Journal of Comparative Physiology A 211 637–640. (https://link.springer.com/article/10.1007/s00359-025-01763-4).

23. Srinivasan M, Tautz J (2025) “The honey bee odometer was not miscalibrated: A guide for properly investigating how honeybees measure how far they have travelled”. Bee World 102(1) 21–22. (https://doi.org/10.1080/0005772X.2025.2477427).

24. Stuart, Geoffrey W. (2025) “A plea for scientific integrity: a comment on the honeybee odometer controversy”. Journal of Comparative Physiology A 211 641–644. (https://link.springer.com/article/10.1007/s00359-025-01765-2)

25. Stuart, Geoffrey W. (2024) “Miscalibration of simulations: A comment on Luebbert and Pachter: 'Miscalibration of the honeybee odometer' arXiv:2405.12998v1” (https://arxiv.org/abs/2408.07713)
