= Vernon R. Young =

Welsh nutritional biochemist

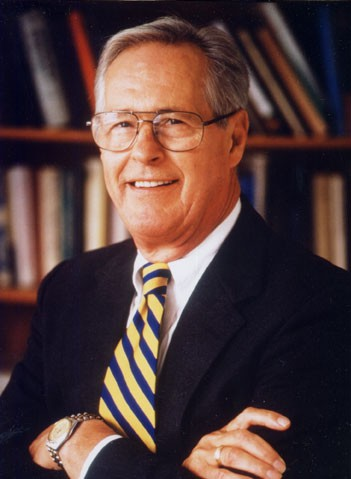
Vernon Young

Vernon Robert Young (November 15, 1937 – March 30, 2004) was an expert on protein and amino acid requirements and researched how the human body processes nutrients into protein. Young was a principal organizer of amino acid Workshops sponsored by the International Council of Amino Acid Science and was the Chairman of the Council's Scientific Advisory Board.

Young died in 2004.

== Early life and education ==
Young was born in Rhyl, Wales, and educated in England at the University of Cambridge and the University of Reading, where he received degrees in agriculture, before earning his doctorate in nutrition at the University of California, Davis, in 1966.

== Career ==
He joined the M.I.T. faculty in 1966 and in 1977 became a professor of nutritional biochemistry. Young served as associate program director for M.I.T.'s Clinical Research Center during the 1980s and held posts at Harvard Medical School and the Boston Shriners Hospital. He was a former president of the American Institute of Nutrition and, in 1990, was elected to the National Academy of Sciences. In 1993, Young was elected to the academy's Institute of Medicine.

His contributions were recognized not only by his election to the National Academy of Sciences (USA) and to the Institute of Medicine of the Academy, but also by his receipt of awards, including the Mead-Johnson, Borden, and Conrad Elvehjem Awards of the American Society for Nutritional Sciences, the McCollum Award of the American Society of Clinical Nutrition, the Rank Prize in Nutrition in 1989, the Gopalan Oration and Gold Medal of the Nutrition Society of India, the Bristol Myers Squibb Award for Distinguished Achievement in Nutrition Research, the Danone International Prize for Nutrition, the Roger Williams Award in Preventive Nutrition, the International Award for Modern Nutrition, the W.O. Atwater Award from the USDA Agricultural Research Service, and the Jonathan E. Rhoads Award of the American Society for Parental and Enteral Nutrition.

In 2001, Young was named to the board of directors of Nestle corporation.

=== Additional academic appointments ===
In addition to his professorship at MIT, Young served as associate program director of the MIT Clinical Research Center, 1985–1987, and director of research for the Shriners Burns Institute, 1987-1990. Additional appointments in Boston at the time of his death included lecturer in surgery, Harvard University, and senior visiting scientist, U.S. Department of Agriculture Human Center on Aging, Tufts University, 1988-2004.

Young also held appointments as visiting professor at the University of California, Los Angeles, 1983; University of Southern California Medical School, March 1984; University of Illinois, Urbana, March 1986; University of Michigan, Ann Arbor, March 1986; University of Iowa, Iowa City, May 1986; University of Florida, Gainesville, December 1987; Dartmouth Medical School, Hanover, January 1988; Case Western Reserve School of Medicine, Cleveland, September 1988. He served as visiting research fellow, Merton College, Oxford, U.K., April–June 1994; visiting scholar, University of Texas Health Sciences Center at San Antonio 1996; and visiting professor, the Universities of Wageningen and Maastrich, The Netherlands, 2000; and visiting research fellow, University of Ulster, Coleraine, Northern Ireland, 2002.

== National and international lectureships and committees ==
Young's named lectureships included the Vickers Lecture of the British Neonatal Health Science Center, San Antonio, 1986; the American Society for Nutritional Sciences McCollum Award Lecture, 1987; Burns Lecture, Royal College of Physicians and Surgeons, Scotland, 1990; Brackenridge Lecture, University of Texas Health Science Center, San Antonio, 1996; Bruce and Virginia Street Lecture in Preventive Nutrition, University of North Texas, Fort Worth, 1996; Ninth Annual Malcolm Trout Lecture, Michigan State University, 1997; Rudolf Schonheimer Centenary Lecture, Nutrition Society of U.K.,1998; first David Murdock Lecture in Nutrition, Mayo Clinic, Rochester, 1998; Jonathan Roads Lecture, American Society for Parenteral and Enteral Nutrition. 1999; Hans Fischer Lecture, Rutgers University, New Brunswick, 1999; and W. O. Atwater Lecture and Award, USDA Agricultural Research Service, 2001.

Editorial boards on which he served included the American Journal of Clinical Nutrition, 1976–1978; Nutrition Research, 1980–1984; Advances in Nutrition Research, 1976–2004; Pediatric Gastroenterology and Nutrition, 1981–1985; Age, 1977–1982; Growth, 1986–1990; Journal of the Nutrition Society of Nigeria, 1990–1994; and Nutrition Today, 1997-2004.

== Awards ==
Mead-Johnson Award (1973), the Borden Award (1983), the McCollum Award (1987), the Rank Prize in Nutrition (1989), and Danone Prize (1998).
