= Louise Vet =

Dutch ecologist

Louise E.M. Vet
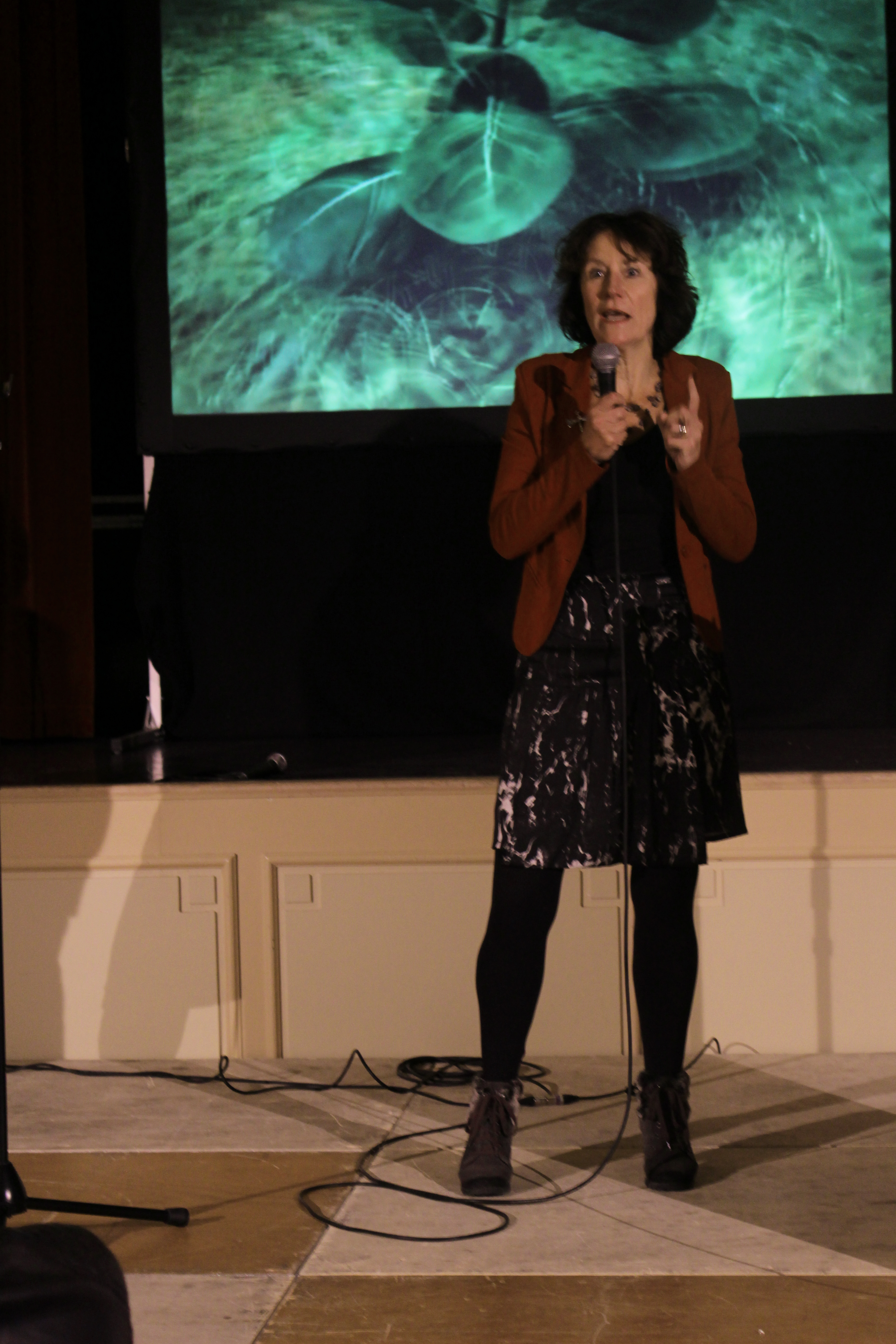
- Louise Vet presenting at the Dutch Ig Nobel Night
- Born: 9 January 1954 (age 72); Haarlem, The Netherlands
- Education: Leiden University
- Occupation: Ecologist
- Known for: NIOO-KNAW leadership

Louise Elisabeth Maria Vet (born in Haarlem on 9 January 1954) is a Dutch biologist and emeritus professor of ecology at Wageningen University. In addition to her scientific career, she focuses on increasing environmental awareness among the general public and promoting environmentally friendly initiatives.

== Life and work ==
Vet studied biology in Leiden, did research in Meijendel and completed her study in 1978. She then conducted research at the University of California and Leiden University, where she obtained her PhD in 1984 with her thesis Comparative ecology of hymenopterous parasitoids on the ecology and behavior of hymenopteran insects.

In 1997 she became a professor at Wageningen University and Research and in 1999 was named director of the Netherlands Institute of Ecology (NIOO-KNAW), one of the largest institutes of the Royal Netherlands Academy of Arts and Sciences. She led that organization until 2019.

Her research, both at NIOO and at Wageningen University, focuses on the ecology and evolution of plant-insect relationships, partly aimed at shaping sustainable agriculture - agro-ecosystems based on the prevention of diseases and plagues.

=== Social commitment ===
Vet gives public lectures about the interactions of ecology and evolution and she emphasizes the societal impact of ecological science, stimulating a positive interaction between ecology and economy.

She was very involved in the design of the new NIOO building, which has been called the most sustainable laboratory and office complex in the Netherlands.

=== Selected awards ===
- 1996: Silverstein - Simeone Award of the International Society of Chemical Ecology
- 2004: Elected as a member of the Royal Netherlands Academy of Arts and Sciences (KNAW)
- 2006: British Rank Prize for Nutrition (jointly with Joop van Lenteren and Marcel Dicke)
- 2012: Golden Pyramid State Prize for outstanding commissioned work in architecture
- 2017: Honorary Membership of the British Ecological Society
- 2018: Voted among the Sustainable 100 by the daily newspaper Trouw
- 2019: Named Knight in the Order of the Dutch Lion
