= Peter B. Denyer =

British academic

Peter Brian Denyer (27 April 1953 – 22 April 2010) was a British electronics engineer, academic, scientist, inventor, and entrepreneur who pioneered CMOS image sensor chips for many applications including mobile phones, webcams, video-conferencing cameras, and optical computer mouse. "Undoubtedly, his greatest legacy...was his work in fitting mini-cameras in mobile phones." wrote the Herald Scotland. From an EE professorship at the University of Edinburgh, he went on to found VLSI Vision Inc., later known as VISION Group plc, an early maker of CMOS image sensors that sold itself to STMicroelectronics. The first academic to grow a Scottish university spin-out company to PLC, he was described by the Royal Society as "a unique combination of electronics engineer, distinguished academic, inventor, company CEO and multiple entrepreneur."

"To say that Denyer 'invented' the mobile phone camera," wrote one obituarist, "would be unfair to the rest of his research team at the University of Edinburgh and to parallel researchers worldwide....But, although the camera phone phenomenon was but a twinkle in Denyer's eye when he started out, he became internationally recognised as a driving force in the technology known as CMOS (complementary metal-oxide semiconductor) which still features in hundreds of millions of mobile phones around the globe."

== Early life and education ==
Denyer was born in Littlehampton in West Sussex, the son of Eveline and Robert Denyer. He attended Worthing Technical High School, then went on to Loughborough University in Leicestershire, and graduated with a first-class BSc honours degree in electrical engineering in 1975. He worked briefly at the Government Communications Headquarters (GCHQ) in Cheltenham, the UK intelligence agency that provides signals intelligence to the government and armed services, where he met Fiona Reoch. They married, and he moved to Edinburgh, where she was teaching at George Watson's College. In Edinburgh he designed LSI circuits for Ferranti Defence Systems, and later for Wolfson Microelectronics, including a digital micrometer and CCD signal processing arrays for sonar pulse compression, while studying part-time for a PhD at the University of Edinburgh. He also worked for a year as cofounder and Director of the LSI design house Denyer-Walmsley Microelectronics Ltd.

== Career ==
=== University of Edinburgh ===
In 1980 Denyer became a lecturer at the University of Edinburgh, where he carried out a series of research projects and held multiple consultancies. His first research project there involved the invention of "a method of bit-serial silicon compilation." Denyer then, in quick succession, became a Reader at the university and then a Professor. According to the Royal Society, Denyer's "promotion from Reader to Professor set a record – on 1 October 1986 he was appointed Reader, but the very next day he was appointed to the Advent Chair of Integrated Electronics (Venture Capital), becoming the youngest Professor at the University of Edinburgh. Through the venture capitalist Advent, this post carried consultancy links with many other companies." Carver Mead, a leading figure in VLSI research, said at the time that Denyer was "one of a handful of most creative and innovative workers in the VLSI field...There are, world-wide, perhaps two or three people of any age that combine a comparable depth of scientific understanding, with a demonstrated capability to subject their ideas to real, experimental verification." Mead invited Denyer to join him at the California Institute of Technology, but largely because Denyer's Glasgow-born wife wanted to educate their children in Scotland, Denyer did not emigrate.

=== Other activities of the early 1980s ===
During his early years at Edinburgh, Denyer "took up two Fellowships – one with Sir Clive Sinclair and then one in information technology. He also held extensive consultancies, including with BT, BP, Thorn-EMI ESA, Shlumberger and, with colleagues, gave short courses to industry. His next step was to secure funding for the Silicon Architectures Research Initiative, a 30-man joint programme between the University and seven supporting companies, which he led."

=== VVL ===
Aware of the shortcomings of commercially available imaging systems, Denyer sought to create better imager chips. His first objectives with regard to CMOS chips was to develop them for use in security systems. This effort resulted in the world's first single-chip CMOS (complementary metal-oxide semiconductor) video camera, completed in 1989 and described in a paper published that year by Denyer and his colleagues David Renshaw, Lu Mingying, and Wang Guoyo. In order to develop this technology in a commercial direction, to invent a variety of devices making use of it, to sell single-chip video cameras, and to ensure that they maintained their intellectual rights to the products deriving from their research, Denyer and Renshaw established VLSI Vision Ltd (VVL) in 1990 with the help of financial support from the university and from venture capitalists.

It took a while before the firm's CMOS chips were able to match the quality of the pre-existing technology, known as CCDs. But eventually the firm became very successful, growing from one employee to about a hundred and establishing offices in California and New Jersey. It was the first company based at a Scottish university to become a PLC and be traded on the London Stock Exchange. As Denyer said, "we did beat the pants off" the CCD-producing competition "on the level of integration we could achieve, and in particular the power consumption of CMOS camera chips....In 1997 we shipped a million cameras.....These were the glory years for me as well as for the company."

"One day I would be deep inside the circuit that was going to reduce noise levels by two electrons, the next I was schmoozing City fund managers. On top of this a million people on the street were using my products." For several years VVL held a clear lead in the field. Denyer continued to develop new products, and an account by the Royal Society praises his generosity in handing over many of them to other scientists to develop, as well as the "extraordinary skill" with which he persuaded bankers and venture capitalists to invest in VVL as it continued to grow.

Then came trouble. By the mid 1990s, competitors to VVL had begun to emerge in the US and Asia. VVL began to lose money. "We were crucified for this," said Denyer. To preserve its competitive edge and restore its profitability, VVL needed to expand, and to this end Denyer sold the firm in 1998 for £23.2 million to ST Microelectronics, a semiconductor firm of which it became the standalone Imaging Division. "One of the hardest days of my professional life," said Denyer, "was the day I stood in front of my company and told them I had sold the business." As a result of the sale, ST Microelectronics has become one of the world's leading producers of camera chips for mobile phones. "By 2005, more CMOS cameras than CCDs were being shipped," Denyer later said. "All that cranky prophesy that I had indulged in as an academic had finally come true." The R&D division is still located in Edinburgh and retains its strong tie to the university's School of Engineering. "The fact that he sold the company in return for share options – which later went down – meant he did not become a greatly wealthy man." reported the Herald Scotland.

=== Post-VVL ===
Between 1992 and 1998, Denyer was on a leave of absence from his chair at the university; in 1998, after selling VVL, he resigned from his chair. He then began to focus on helping young academics with potentially commercial ideas to establish start-ups and attract investors. He also co-founded and served as chairman of the firm MicroEmissive Displays (MED), which was based at the Scottish Microelectronics Centre on the campus of the University of Edinburgh and was the world's leading developer of polymer organic light-emitting-diode (P-OLED)-based microdisplays. MED was credited in the Guinness Book of World Records with having created the world's smallest TV screen, which was the size of a child's fingernail. MED established itself as "the world's leading developer of polymer organic light emitting diode (P-OLED) based microdisplays, which consume less power than liquid crystal and liquid-crystal-on- silicon microdisplays." Denyer also co-founded and became chair of Rhetorical Systems, which he later sold to Nuance Communications Inc,

During his last decade, Denyer was involved in the establishment of a series of Scottish high-tech businesses, providing advice and/or financial backing to many of them and creating over 100 jobs. In a 2008 interview, Denyer explained that at that point he was "on my third wave" of start-ups, "six of them. Most of them university spin outs." He became chair of the firms ATEEDA and QFT; served as an adviser to and director of Dexela, which designed large-area X-ray sensors for mammography; chaired Eleksen Ltd, a tech company which develops applications for sensing fabric; chaired Quantum Filament Technology, commercializing a novel field-emission approach for the next generation of flat displays; and sat on the board of the London-based ERA Foundation, whose purpose is to help invigorate the British economy by enabling the exploitation of electrotechnology research. After Denyer's death, the ERA Foundation's chairman, Sir Alan Rudge, described Denyer as "a thoughtful visionary and energetic enthusiast" In addition, Denyer served as chair of Pufferfish, a firm started by Edinburgh students, which produced Pufferspheres, the suspended projectors used at concerts. In 2001 the University of Edinburgh, where he served as an advisor to the Commercialisation Unit, made him an Honorary Professor. According to science writer Michael Kenward, Denyer was driven to entrepreneurship less by the profit motive than by the belief that his work could not change things if handed over "to the slowly grinding wheels of ponderous big companies."

== Selected publications ==
Denyer's publications include three textbooks and around 100 co-authored academic papers, including three awards for best paper.

1992

- Arne Halaas, Peter B. Denyer (Eds.): VLSI 91, Proceedings of the IFIP TC10/WG 10.5 International Conference on Very Large Scale Integration, Edinburgh, Scotland, 20–22 August 1991. IFIP Transactions A-1, North-Holland.

1991

- Peter B. Denyer, David S. Renshaw, Gouyu Wang, Ming Ying Lu, Stuart Anderson: On-Chip CMOS Sensors for VLSI Imaging Systems. VLSI 1991: 157–166

1990

- Douglas M. Grant, Peter B. Denyer: Memory, Control and Communications Synthesis for Scheduled Algorithms. DAC 1990: 162–167
- David J. Mallon, Peter B. Denyer: A new approach to pipeline optimisation. EURO-DAC 1990: 83–88

1986

- Peter B. Denyer: Advanced Microelectronics as a Foundation for Future Computers (Panel). IFIP Congress 1986: 81–82

1985

- Peter B. Denyer, David Renshaw: VLSI Signal Processing: A Bit-Serial Approach

1983

- Alan F. Murray, Peter B. Denyer, David S. Renshaw: Self-Testing in Bit Serial VLSI Parts: High Coverage at Low Cost. ITC 1983: 260–268

== Honors and awards ==
In 1997 VVL received a Queen's Award for Industry. In 1998 Denyer was awarded the Royal Academy of Engineering's Silver Medal and on 2 March 1998 was appointed a Fellow of the Royal Society of Edinburgh. Denyer also personally received a Queen's Award for Technology for his work on CMOS systems, as well as the IEEE Millennium Award.

In 2008 Denyer, Renshaw, Wang and Lu were recognised for their pioneering research with the Rank Prize in Optoelectronics. Accepting the prize, Denyer said: "Our work was not always so well regarded, certainly in its earliest days when the doubters were many and the believers were... well, just ourselves."

Denyer was a Fellow of the Institution of Engineering and Technology, a Fellow of the Institute of Nanotechnology, and a Fellow of the Royal Academy of Engineering.

== Personal life ==
Denyer died of cancer and was survived by his wife, Fiona, daughters Kate and Kirsty, father, mother and two brothers, Geoff and Barry. One of his brothers wrote after his death: "If you own a digital camera or a mobile phone with a camera in then you should say a quiet 'Thank you' to Pete. For a long time he held the patent for the chip behind every digital camera – he sold the company many years ago."

Denyer had a holiday cottage in Keltneyburn, Aberfeldy, and in his last years took up sailing, progressing in two years from novice to skipper. He became an enthusiastic yachtsman, sailing his yacht Tigger Too, which was moored at Ardfern, Lochgilphead, off the west coast of Scotland and in the Mediterranean.
