= Jonathan C. Knight =

British physicist (born 1964)

Jonathan Cave Knight
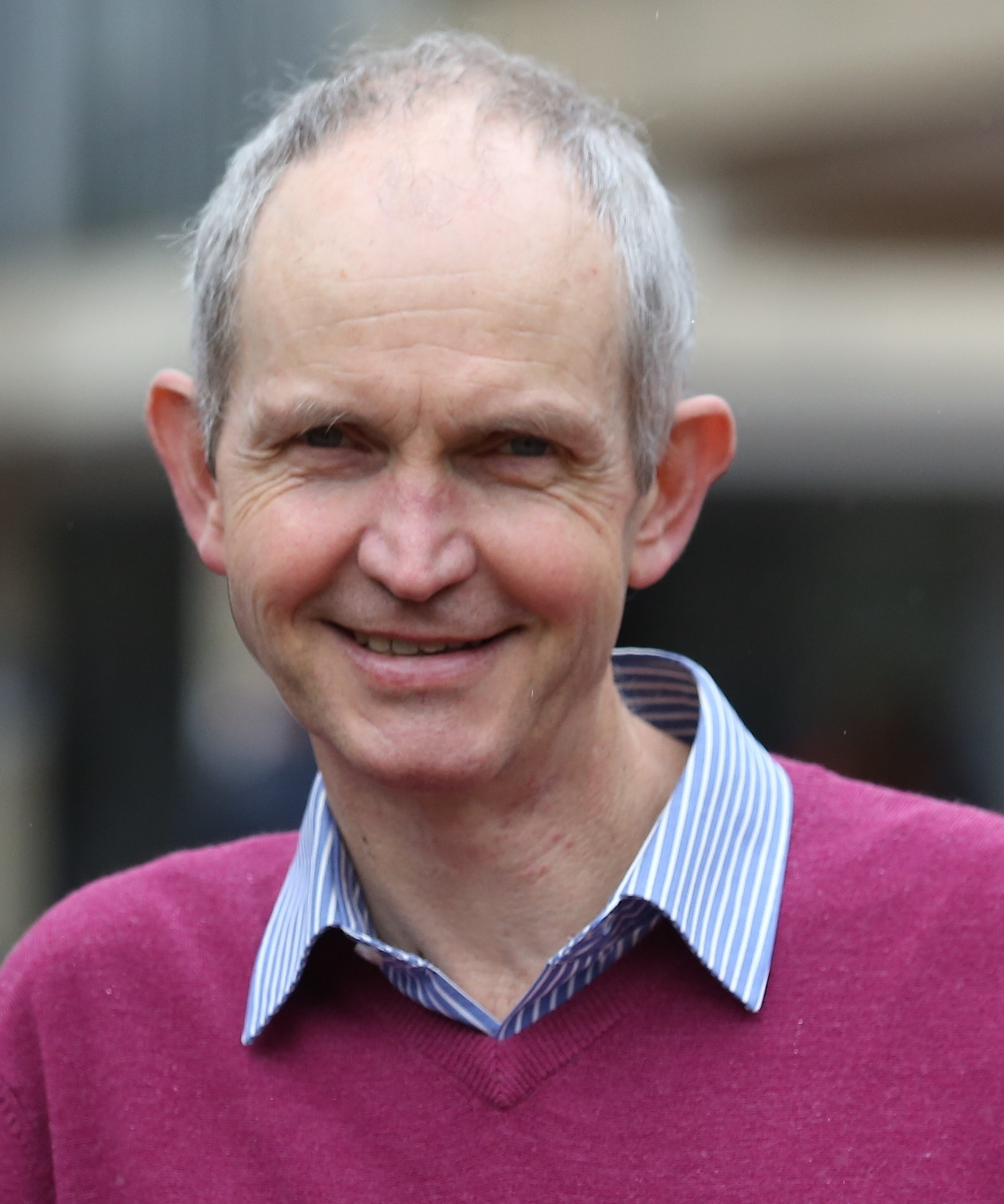
- Born: 17 June 1964; Lusaka, Zambia
- Education: University of Cape Town
- Known for: Photonic-crystal fiber Optical Fibers
- Scientific career
- Fields: Physics, photonics
- Workplaces: University of Bath
- Thesis: Whispering gallery mode microlaser in a capillary fibre (1993)
- Doctoral advisor: G N Robertson, H S T Driver

Jonathan C. Knight, FRS (born 1964, in Lusaka) is a British physicist. He is the Pro Vice-Chancellor (Research) for the University of Bath where he has been Professor in the Department of Physics since 2000, and served as head of department. From 2005 to 2008, he was founding Director of the university's Centre for Photonics and Photonic Materials.

== Education ==
Knight studied at the University of Cape Town where he obtained his B.Sc. (Hons), M.Sc. and PhD. His doctoral thesis was on whispering gallery mode microlasers. He did postdoctoral research at the École Normale Supérieure (Paris, 1994–1995) and at the Optoelectronics Research Centre (University of Southampton, 1995–1996).

== Research ==
Knight is interested in the behaviour of light in microstructured materials, and in the physics of optical fibres. Working with Russell and Tim Birks, he designed, fabricated and demonstrated the power of lattice cladding within sub-wavelength fibre architectures. Knight's principles readily form the basis of modern, sub-wavelength fibre optics. This work has led to a range of outcomes, including the commercialisation^{,} of a new form of light source (supercontinuum), high power short pulse laser delivery through fibre, and applications in quantum and atomic physics.. More recently, this work has found application in hollow core fibre technology. Belardi and Knight proposed the hollow-core "nested-ring" design for photonic fibres, at the beginning of 2014. Together, at University of Bath, Knight and William Wadsworth co-created a new kind of laser capable of pulsed and continuous mid-infrared (IR) emission between 3.1 and 3.2 microns, a spectral range that has long presented a major challenge for laser developers.

== Awards and recognition ==
- Elected Fellow of the Royal Society, 2019.
- Rank Prize in Optoelectronics Optoelectronics Prize, 2018
- Institute of Physics Optics and Photonics Division Prize, 2012
- Fellow of Optical Society of America, 2011
- Leverhulme Trust Research Fellowship, 2005–2006

== Selected publications ==
- Yu, F.; Wadsworth, W.J.; Knight, J.C. (2012). "Low loss silica hollow-core fibers for 3-4 μm spectral region" (PDF). Optics Express. 20 (10): 11153–8. Bibcode:2012OExpr..2011153Y. doi:10.1364/OE.20.011153. PMID 22565738.
- Stone, J. M.; Knight, J. C. (2008). "Visibly "white" light generation in uniform photonic crystal fiber using a microchip laser" (PDF). Optics Express. 16 (4): 2670–2675. Bibcode:2008OExpr..16.2670S. doi:10.1364/OE.16.002670. PMID 18542351.
- Knight, J. C. (2003). "Photonic crystal fibres". Nature. 424 (6950): 847–851. Bibcode:2003Natur.424..847K. doi:10.1038/nature01940. PMID 12917699. S2CID 23008689.
- Knight, J. C.; Russel, P. St. J. (2002). "New ways to guide light". Science. 296 (5566): 276–277. doi:10.1126/science.1070033. PMID 11951025. S2CID 34290857.
- Knight, J. C.; Broeng, J.; Birks, T. A.; Russell, P. St.J. (1998). "Photonic band gap guidance in optical fibers". Science. 282 (5393): 1476–1478. doi:10.1126/science.282.5393.1476. PMID 9822375.
- Knight, J. C.; Cheung, G.; Jacques, F.; Birks, T. A. (1997). "Phase-matched excitation of whispering-gallery-mode resonances by a fiber taper". Optics Letters. 22 (15): 1129–1131. Bibcode:1997OptL...22.1129K. doi:10.1364/OL.22.001129. PMID 18185771.
- Knight, J. C.; Birks, T. A.; Russell, P. St. J.; Atkin, D. M. (1996). "All-silica single-mode optical fiber with photonic crystal cladding". Optics Letters. 21 (19): 1547–9. Bibcode:1996OptL...21.1547K. doi:10.1364/OL.21.001547. PMID 19881720.
