= Robyn Owens =

Australian mathematician and computer vision researcher

Robyn Anne Owens is an Australian applied mathematician and computer scientist known for her research in computer vision and face recognition, and on the non-invasive imaging of lactation. Formerly a professor at the University of Western Australia (UWA) and the deputy vice-chancellor for research at UWA, she retired in 2019, and remains affiliated with UWA as a professorial fellow.

== Education and career ==
Owens earned a bachelor's degree in mathematics (with honours) at the University of Western Australia and a doctorate in mathematics at the Somerville College, Oxford. Her 1980 dissertation, Almost Periodic Hardy Spaces, was supervised by David Albert Edwards. She returned to the University of Western Australia after postdoctoral study at Paris-Sud University. Before becoming vice-chancellor for research, she headed the UWA School of Computer Science & Software Engineering.

== Recognition ==
With her co-author Peter E. Hartmann, she was a winner of the 2010 Rank Prize in Nutrition, given at the Royal College of Physicians in London, for their work on the imaging of lactation.

Owens is a Fellow of the Australian Computer Society, a Fellow of the Australian Academy of Technology and Engineering (elected 2012),a Fellow of the Australian Academy of Science (elected 2020), and a Fellow of the International Core Academy of Sciences and Humanities.

In the 2023 King's Birthday Honours Owens was appointed a Member of the Order of Australia for "significant service to science in the fields of computer vision and mathematics".
