= Marcel Dicke =

Dutch entomologist (born 1957)

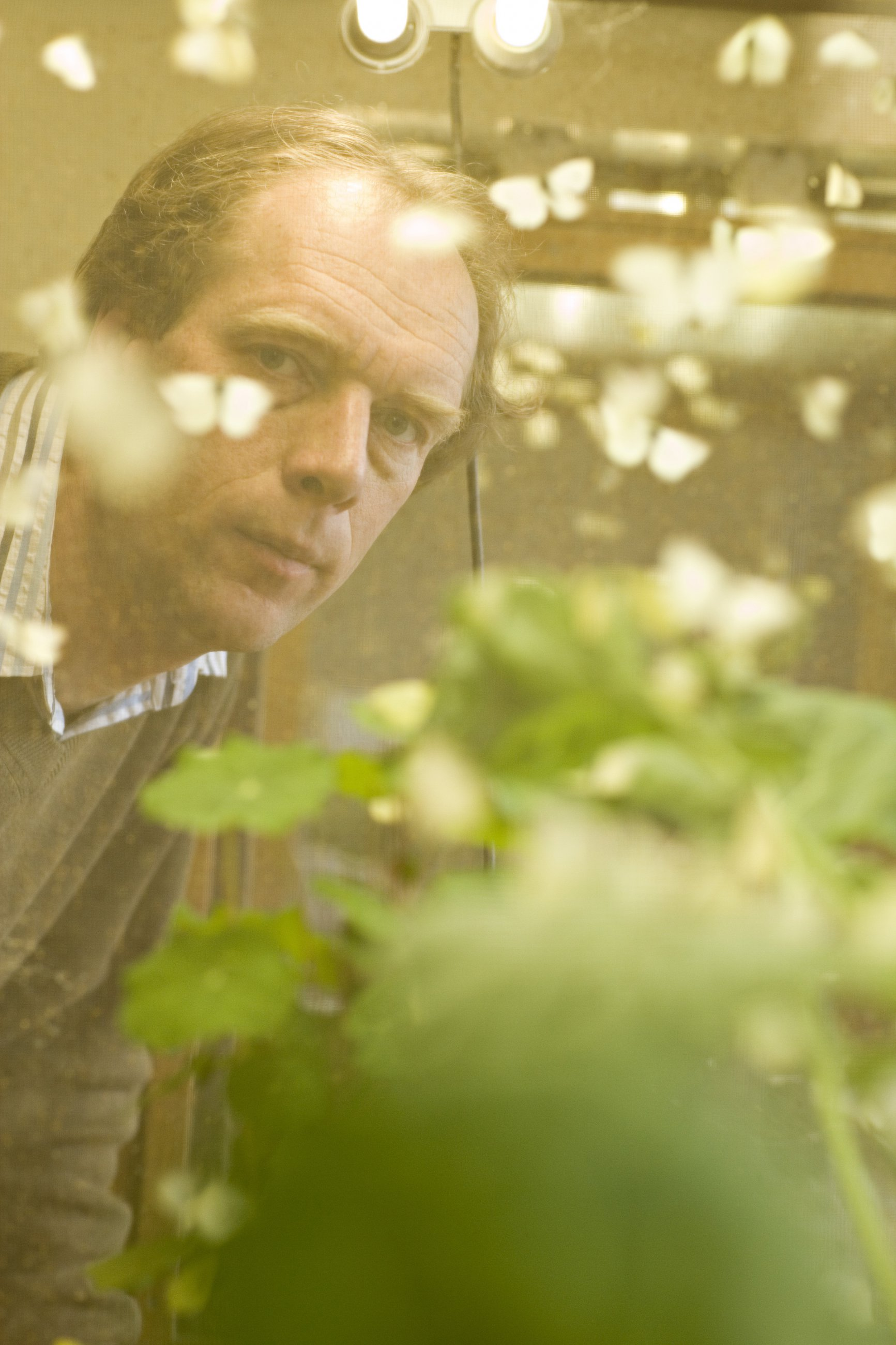
- Born: November 28, 1957 (age 68); Dordrecht, Netherlands
- Education: Wageningen University, Leiden University
- Scientific career
- Fields: Entomology, Chemical Ecology
- Workplaces: Wageningen University
- Thesis: Infochemicals In Tritrophic Interactions. Origin and function in a system consisting of predatory mites (1988)
- Academic advisors: Joop van Lenteren and Maus Sabelis
- Website: Website

Marcel Dicke (born November 28, 1957, in Dordrecht, Netherlands) is a Dutch professor of entomology who has been affiliated with Wageningen University since 2002. He conducts research on insects and has published in the scientific journals Science and Nature. Dicke received the Spinoza Prize in 2007 for his research on the interactions between plants and insects.

== Career ==
Dicke studied biology at Leiden University, where he graduated cum laude in 1982. Subsequently, he obtained his PhD in 1988 at Wageningen University. With Joop van Lenteren and Maus Sabelis as advisers, he wrote a PhD thesis titled Infochemicals In Tritrophic Interactions. Origin and function in a system consisting of predatory mites. From 1997 to 2001 Dicke held the Uyttenboogaart-Eliasen chair, part of the Entomology chair group, where he has been a professor since 2002.

Since 2003 Dicke has been a board member of the Agricultural Export Fund 1918 and since 2006 he has been vice-chairman of the Dutch Entomological Society. In 2008 he was elected as a member of the Royal Dutch Society of Sciences and in 2013 he was a jury member of the Dr. AH. Heineken Prize for Environmental Sciences. In 2013 he became chairman of the Uyttenboogaart-Eliasen Foundation and chairman of the board of directors of the Van Groenendael-Krijger Foundation.

Dicke's book Blij met een dooie mug en andere verhalen over insecten (Happy with a dead mosquito and other stories about insects) was published in 2011.

Dicke took up emeritus status in November 2024.

== Scientific activities ==
Dicke's research is focused on the tritrophic interactions between plants, herbivorous insects, and predatory insects. In research published in 1988, he was the first to show that, when consumed by herbivorous insects, certain plants secrete substances that attract predatory insects.

More recently, Dicke has initiated efforts to make the consumption of insects more acceptable to the general public. For example, he was a speaker at TEDGlobal in 2010, where presented a talk Why not eat insects?, which substantiated why people should eat more insects. Dicke has stated that raising insects as food is energy-efficient, it produces less waste than raising other animals, and there may be positive human health effects from consuming insects. In 2014, together with Arnold van Huis and Henk van Gump, he published The Insect Cookbook: Food for a Sustainable Planet, a translation of and expansion of Het insectenkookboek (The Insect Cookbook), of which Dicke is also co-author.

As a researcher, Dicke has more than six hundred publications to his name, including ones in the highly ranked scientific journals Nature and Science.

== Honors ==
In 2006 Dicke received the Rank Prize (jointly with Joop van Lenteren and Louise Vet) and in the same year he received the Academic Year Prize for organizing City of Insects in Wageningen, which attracted more than 20,000 visitors.

In 2007 he was awarded the Spinoza Prize for his research into the interaction between plants and insects. In 2011 Dicke was elected to the Royal Netherlands Academy of Arts and Sciences, where he is a member of the biology section. In 2013, together with the "Team Vroege Vogels", he won the Eureka Prize for science communication for his efforts to increase science involvement in the general public and make scientific knowledge more accessible to a wide audience.
