= Gordon Gurr =

Australian sportsman (1881–1960)

Personal information
- Full name: Gordon Caleb Gurr
- Born: 22 December 1881; Adelaide
- Died: 11 August 1960 (aged 78); Loxton, South Australia

Playing career^{1}
Years	Club	Games (Goals)
1902–1907	Sturt	52 (16)
- ^{1} Playing statistics correct to the end of 1907.

Gordon Gurr
Career statistics
Competition	First-class
Matches	1
Runs scored	0
Batting average	0.00
100s/50s	0/0
Top score	0
Balls bowled	0
Wickets	0
Bowling average	-
5 wickets in innings	0
10 wickets in match	0
Best bowling	-
Catches/stumpings	0/0
- Source: Cricinfo, 16 March 2019

Gordon Caleb Gurr (22 December 1881 – 11 August 1960) was an Australian sportsman who represented South Australia in cricket and played with Sturt in the South Australian Football Association.

Gurr started playing football for Sturt in 1902, just their second season in the South Australian Football Association. He was club captain in 1904 and 1905, years in which Sturt finished fifth on the ladder, in a six team competition.

He made one appearance for the South Australian cricket team at first-class level, which was against Western Australia on Fremantle Oval in the 1905–06 season. Playing as a wicket-keeper, Gurr scored a duck in his only innings and was unable to register a catch or a stumping.
