= Maryanne Large =

American physicist

Maryanne C J Large
- Education: Trinity College Dublin
- Occupation: Physicist
- Employer: University of Sydney
- Known for: Optics
- Title: Professor

Maryanne C J Large or Maryanne Large is a physicist, who specialises in optics and materials science at the University of Sydney.

== Education ==
Large obtained a Bachelor of Science from the University of Sydney, and a PhD in optics from Trinity College, Dublin.

== Publications ==
Large has over 100 publications, over 7000 citations, and an H index of 40, as at November 2026. She has multiple publiations in Optics Express, and Optics Letters. She has contributed to chapters within 2 books published, as at November 2026. Select publications include the following:

- X. Zhang, R. Wang, F. M. Cox, B.T. Kuhlmey, and M. C. J. Large, "Selective coating of holes in microstructured optical fiber and its application to in-fiber absorptive polarizers," Opt. Express 15, 16270-16278 (2007).
- Cristiano M. B. Cordeiro, Marcos A. R. Franco, Giancarlo Chesini, Elaine C. S. Barretto, Richard Lwin, C. H. Brito Cruz, and Maryanne C. J. Large, "Microstructured-core optical fibre for evanescent sensing applications," Opt. Express 14, 13056-13066 (2006)
- Karen E Carroll, Chi Zhang, David J. Webb, Kyriacos Kalli, Alexander Argyros, and Maryanne C. J. Large, "Thermal response of Bragg gratings in PMMA microstructured optical fibers," Opt. Express 15, 8844-8850 (2007).

== Career ==
Large's career is centered around the research of experimental physics and developing an understanding around optics, including polymer fibres, photonic structures, and optical biomimetics. Her research is based around microstructured polymer optical fibres, and designing metamaterials and biomedical devices for high-data communications and medican sensing. She is a member of the University of Sydney Nano Institute.

She has worked on projects including developing bushfire resilience, and understanding impacts of bushfires. She led a project with Bush Heritage Australia, in 2021, winning the Physics Grand Challenge, aiming to support unconventional, innovative and interdisciplinary research. The team is made of ecologists, robotics experts, geoscientists and physicists, and aims to develop instruments to understand landscapes.

Large has also worked on the reflection and colour in animals, including beetles and other insects wing structure.

== Awards ==
- 2021 - Physics Grand Challenges Winner: Partnered with Bush Heritage Australia. "An Eye in the Sky: Remote Sensing for Advanced Ecosystem Monitoring".
