= Craig Gurr =

Zimbabwean cricketer (born 1973)

Personal information
- Full name: Craig Peter Gurr
- Born: 8 February 1973 (age 53); Salisbury, Rhodesia
- Batting: Right-handed
- Role: Wicket-keeper

Domestic team information
- Years: Team
- 1998/99: Mashonaland A

Career statistics
Competition	FC
Matches	5
Runs scored	69
Batting average	13.80
100s/50s	0/0
Top score	21
Catches/stumpings	5/1
- Source: ESPNcricinfo, 21 July 2021

Craig Peter Gurr (born 8 February 1973) is a former Zimbabwean cricketer. A wicket-keeper, he played one first-class match for Mashonaland A during the 1998–99 Logan Cup. He also played for Zimbabwe Cricket Union President's XI and Zimbabwe A.
