= Journal of Comparative Physiology A =

- Discipline: Neuroethology, physiology
- Language: English
- Edited by: Günther K.H. Zupanc

Publication details
- History: 1924–present
- Publisher: Springer Science+Business Media
- Frequency: Bi-Monthly
- Impact factor: 2.1 (2022)

Standard abbreviations
- ISO 4: J. Comp. Physiol. A

Indexing
- ISSN: 0340-7594 (print); 1432-1351 (web)
- LCCN: 2002025116
- OCLC no.: 643628496

Links
- Journal homepage; Online access

The Journal of Comparative Physiology A: Neuroethology, Sensory, Neural, and Behavioral Physiology is a bi-monthly peer-reviewed scientific journal covering the intersection of ethology, neuroscience, and physiology. It was founded in 1924 by Karl von Frisch and Alfred Kühn under its German title Zeitschrift für vergleichende Physiologie. To indicate its global orientation, it changed its name to Journal of Comparative Physiology in 1972. Reflecting the trend toward specialization in the sciences, it split into two daughter journals, 'A' and 'B', in 1976. The editor-in-chief is Günther K.H. Zupanc (Northeastern University).

== Abstracting and indexing ==
The journal is indexed and abstracted in the following bibliographic databases:

- Academic Search Premier
- Agricultural & Environmental Science Database
- Animal Behavior Abstracts
- Aquatic Sciences and Fisheries Abstracts
- BIOSIS
- CAB Abstracts
- EMBASE
- Environment Index
- MEDLINE
- Veterinary Science Database
- Science Citation Index Expanded
- Scopus

According to the Journal Citation Reports, the journal has a 2022 impact factor of 2.1.
