= Experimental Gerontology =

- Discipline: Biogerontology
- Language: English
- Edited by: Christiaan Leeuwenburgh

Publication details
- History: 1964–present
- Publisher: Elsevier
- Frequency: Monthly
- Impact factor: 3.376 (2019)

Standard abbreviations
- ISO 4: Exp. Gerontol.

Indexing
- ISSN: 0531-5565 (print); 1873-6815 (web)
- LCCN: 65009870
- OCLC no.: 57047418

Links
- Journal homepage; Online access; Online archive

Experimental Gerontology is a monthly peer-reviewed medical journal covering biogerontology. It was established in 1964 and is published by Elsevier. The editor-in-chief is Christiaan Leeuwenburgh (University of Florida College of Medicine). According to the Journal Citation Reports, the journal has a 2019 impact factor of 3.376.
