= Joshua Gurr =

Joshua Gurr (11 March 1819 – 9 November 1910) was a businessman in Adelaide, South Australia.

== History ==
Gurr was born at Lewes, Sussex, and trained as a blacksmith. He emigrated to South Australia aboard Moffatt in August 1839, and shortly entered into partnership with coachbuilder John Green Coulls (c. 1812 – 9 September 1881), who arrived aboard Java in February 1840. They had some part in the construction of John Ridley's first stripper. In September 1845 Gurr left Coulls's Hindley Street business (which became one of the largest in the colony) and opened an iron and coal yard in Currie Street, which prospered.

Jean Ogilvie (1 September 1808 – 27 May 1903) arrived aboard Symmetry in February 1844; they married on 25 July 1845.

Jean's brother Alexander Ogilvie (c. 1810 – 10 October 1884) arrived November 1849 aboard Duke of Wellington with his (second) wife Isabella (died 1856) and four children (by his first wife). Alexander married once more, to Janet Brown (died 1895) in 1859. Some time before 1862 he started working in a managerial capacity at his brother-in-law's store, and was still there in 1871.

He was a foundation member of Zion Chapel, Pulteney street and a generous contributor to the Adelaide City Mission, the Royal Institution for the Blind, and the Blind and Deaf and Dumb Institution, Brighton. In 1903 he established the Jean Cottage Homes, a charitable settlement consisting of three-room homes for elderly couples in Jean Street, Elgin (today's Woodville Park), named for his wife's birthplace, and where he owned considerable property.

He died at his home on Gurrs Road (to this day a major thoroughfare), Kensington after two years as a near-invalid.

Their son John Henry Gurr (31 October 1846 – 17 October 1918) was born in Adelaide, and was educated at J. L. Young's Adelaide Educational Institution (as was his ex-partner's son Joseph Coull). He joined his father's business, and subsequently worked as a land agent and invested in mining shares. He was associated with the Glenelg Congregational Church.

== Family ==
Joshua Gurr (11 March 1819 – 9 November 1910) married Jean Ogilvie (1 September 1808 – 27 May 1903) of Elgin, Scotland, on 25 July 1845. They had one son only:

- John Henry Gurr (31 October 1846 – 17 October 1918) married Emma Selina Bleechmore (c. 1845 – 10 November 1892) on 9 December 1869, had a home "Oliveville", Robert Street, Glenelg.

- Jean Eva Gurr (9 October 1870 – ), born in Elgin, Scotland, married William Thomas Robinson, of Cheviot, New Zealand, on 22 February 1896
- Alfred John Gurr (26 July 1873 – 1938)
- Olive Ethel Gurr (10 January 1880 – 3 April 1884)
- son 3 February 1885 born in Springfield House, Elgin, Scotland, appears not to have survived childhood
- Ruby Adelaide Gurr (31 March 1886 – ) married Clive M. Harris on 8 February 1923 and moved to NSW.
He married again, on 11 October 1894 in New York City, to the widow Agnes Kate Harris, née Bleechmore (1855 – 16 May 1938). They had one further child:
- Kathleen Cleveland Gurr (22 July 1895 – 1957) married John Albert Boundy in 1920
