= Developmental Neurobiology =

- Discipline: Neural development
- Language: English
- Edited by: Bin Chen, Song-Hai Shi, Andreas Prokop

Publication details
- Former name(s): Journal of Neurobiology
- History: 1969-present
- Publisher: Wiley-Blackwell
- Frequency: Monthly
- Open access: Delayed, after 12 months
- Impact factor: 3.935 (2019)

Standard abbreviations
- ISO 4: Dev. Neurobiol.

Indexing
- CODEN: DNEEAM
- ISSN: 1932-8451 (print); 1932-846X (web)
- LCCN: 2006215056
- OCLC no.: 858833906

Links
- Journal homepage; Online access; Online archive

Developmental Neurobiology is a monthly peer-reviewed scientific journal covering all aspects of neural development. It was established in 1969 as Journal of Neurobiology, covering all of neuroscience, but when the scope become more specialized, it obtained its current name in 2007. The journal is published by Wiley-Blackwell. The editor-in-chief is Bin Chen (University of California, Santa Cruz) and the associate editors are Song-Hai Shi (Tsinghua University, Beijing, China) and Andreas Prokop (University of Manchester).

== Abstracting and indexing ==
The journals is abstracted and indexed in:

- Biological Abstracts
- BIOSIS Previews
- CAB Abstracts
- CABDirect
- Chemical Abstracts Service
- Current Contents/Life Sciences
- EMBASE
- Global Health
- Index Medicus/MEDLINE/PubMed
- Index Veterinarius
- PsycINFO/Psychological Abstracts
- Science Citation Index
- Scopus
- The Zoological Record

According to the Journal Citation Reports, the journal has a 2019 impact factor of 3.935.
