= Sarah Gurr =

British plant pathologist

Sarah Jane Gurr
- Born: United Kingdom
- Education: Imperial College London, University of Oxford
- Known for: Research on fungal diseases in plants and global plant biosecurity
- Scientific career
- Fields: Plant pathology, Mycology, Food security
- Workplaces: University of Exeter, University of Oxford, University of St Andrews

Sarah Jane Gurr is a British plant pathologist and academic. She currently holds the Chair in Food Security at the University of Exeter and was formerly Professor of Molecular Plant Pathology at the University of Oxford. She was recognized as a highly cited researcher worldwide by Clarivate Analytics in 2019, 2023, and 2024.

== Education ==
Gurr was educated at The King’s School, Canterbury. She studied at Imperial College of Science, Technology and Medicine, gaining a BSc (Hons) in Plant Sciences, Associate of Royal College of Science (ARCS), Diploma of Imperial College (DIC), PhD in Plant Pathology, and an MA from University of Oxford.

== Academic career ==
Post-graduation, Gurr began her academic career as a Research Assistant at Shell Research International in Sittingbourne, UK. She was a post-doctoral fellow at St Andrews University and then held a Royal Society University Research Fellowship. Gurr was appointed as a University Lecturer at the University of Oxford in 1992 and Tutorial Fellow (Daphne Osborne Fellow) at Somerville College, Oxford. She became Reader and then Professor of Molecular Plant Pathology in 2004. Since 2013, she has held the Chair in Food Security at the University of Exeter.

== Research ==
Gurr’s research focuses on plant diseases, particularly fungal infections and infestations, their global movement, and disease control. Her work spans scales from fungal cell and molecular biology to modelling the movement of fungi across the globe. She has authored or co-authored over 190 publications, including high-profile papers in Science and Nature, several patents, and articles in the popular press. Her work includes contributions to UK Government Foresight reports and advising on the UK Plant Health strategy (2023) and Gene Editing for Crops bill (2023).

== Professional service and recognition ==
Gurr has held several professional roles, including serving as President of the British Society for Plant Pathology (BSPP), on the Board of Directors at Rothamsted Research, and as Council Member of the Biotechnology and Biosciences Research Council (BBSRC). She is co-chair of Rural and Environment Science and Analytical Services (RESAS), Scottish Government, and serves on the International Advisory Board at SLU University, Uppsala.

She is a member of Plant Health Scotland (James Hutton Institute), a Trustee of the Royal Botanic Gardens, Edinburgh, and serves on committees for The Rank Foundation, The Wolfson Trust, and MycoNeos. Gurr held the Donder's Chair (Honorary) at Utrecht University and is Visiting Professor there. She is a Fellow of the Canadian Institute for Advanced Research, Fellow of the American Academy of Microbiology, Senior Research Fellow at Somerville College, Oxford, Honorary Research Associate at the Royal Botanic Gardens, Kew, and Fellow of the James Hutton Institute, Dundee. Gurr is President-elect of the British Mycological Society (BMS).

Throughout her career, she has received several awards for her contributions to science, including the Huxley Medal from Imperial College, a Royal Society Leverhulme Trust Senior Research Fellowship, NESTA Fellowship, the BMS President’s prize, Honorary Membership of BSPP, and an Honorary Doctorate by SLU Uppsala.

== Public engagement and media ==
Gurr is a frequent speaker at national and international scientific conferences, but also for “citizen science”. Her work has been featured in various media outlets, including BBC World News, BBC Radio 4, The Guardian, The New York Times and in various podcasts.

== Personal life ==
Gurr was a curator of the University of Oxford Botanic Garden for over 20 years and co-wrote the science prose for several gold medal winning displays at The Chelsea Flower Show. Her interest in “grapes” led to the award of a Social Blue for “services to the college cellar” at Imperial College.

Gurr has 2 adult daughters, Charlotte and Alice.

== Selected publications ==
- Case, N.T., Gurr, S.J., Fisher, M.C. et al. (2025) Fungal impacts on Earth’s ecosystems. Nature 638, 49–57.
- Fisher, M.C., Burnett, F., Chandler, C. et al. (2024) A one health roadmap towards understanding and mitigating emerging Fungal Antimicrobial Resistance: fAMR. npj Antimicrob Resist 2, 36.
- Stukenbrock, E and Gurr, S.J. (2023) Address the growing urgency of fungal disease in crops. Nature 617, 31–34.
- Johns, L.E., Bebber, B., Gurr, S.J. and Brown, N.A. (2022) Health threat and cost of Fusarium mycotoxins in European wheat. Nature Food 3, 1014–1019.
- Cannon, S. et al. (2022) Multi-site fungicides suppress banana Panama disease. PLOS Pathogens.
- Fisher, M. et al. (2022) Tackling antifungal resistance to human health. Nature Microbiology Reviews.
- Chaloner, T., Gurr, S.J., Bebber, D.P. (2021) The global burden of plant disease tracks yield under climate change. Nature Climate Change.
- Fones, H. et al. (2020) Threats to global food security from emerging fungal pathogens. Nature Food.
- Chaloner, T., Gurr, S.J., Bebber, D. (2020) Geometry and evolution of the ecological niche in microbes. Nature Communications.
- Steinberg, G. et al. (2020) A lipophilic cation protects crops. Nature Communications.
