= List of compounds with carbon number 1 =

This is a partial list of molecules that contain 1 carbon atom.

Chemical formula	Synonyms	CAS number
CAgN	ciainíd airgid	506-64-9
CAlH_{2}N	monaciainíd alúmanaim	19401-01-5
CB	cairbíd bórón	12011-54-0
CBSi	monacairbíd monasiliceach carbóin	12628-09-0
CB_{2}	débhórón cairbíd	12537-86-9
CB_{4}	cairbíd bórón	12069-32-8
CBe_{2}	cairbíd beirilliam	506-66-1
CBr	brómaimeitilidíne	3889-77-8
CBrF_{2}	frithghníomhaí brómaidhéafluarameitile	28882-09-9
CBrN	bróimíd chiainigin	506-68-3
CBrNO	iosicianáit bhróimín	3644-72-2
CBrNO	Ocsaíd bhrómafhoirminitríle	74213-25-5
CBrNS	tíochiaináit bhróimín	29284-59-1
CBrNSe	ciainíd bhróimíd seiléiniam	80039-77-6
CBr_{2}	débhrómaimeitiléin	4371-77-1
CBr_{2}ClF	clóra débhróma fluara meatán	353-55-9
CBr_{2}O	bróimíd chairbóinile	593-95-3
CBr_{3}	frithghníomhaí tríbrómaimeitile	4471-18-5
CBr_{3}Cl	tríbrómaclóraimeatán	594-15-0
CBr_{4}	teitreaibróimíd charbóin	558-13-4
CCe	monacairbíd cheiriam	12011-58-4
CCeRh	monacairbíd monaróidiam monacheiriame	70378-91-5
CCeRu	monocerium monoruthenium monocarbide	70378-92-6
CCeSi	monacairbíd monasiliceach ceiriam	51257-45-5
CCl	clóraimeitilidín	3889-76-7
CClF	clórafluaraimeitiléin	1691-88-9
CClFO	clóiríd fluairíd charbónach	353-49-1
CClFS	clóiríd fluairíd charbóitíoch	1495-18-7
CClF_{2}	frithghníomhaí clóraidhéafluarameitile	1691-89-0
CClF_{3}O_{2}S	clóiríd trífluaraimeatánsuilfóinile	421-83-0
CClF_{3}S	clóiríd trífluaraimeatánsuilféinile	421-17-0
CClN	[[clóiríd chiainigin]]	506-77-4
CClNO	iosicianáit chlóirín	13858-09-8
CClNS	tochiaináit chlóirín	5961-98-8
CClNSe	ciainíd chlóiríd seiléiniam	80039-76-5
CClO	clóiríd chairbóinile	2602-42-8
CCl_{2}	déchlóraimeitiléin	1605-72-7
CCl_{2}F	frithghníomhaí déchlórafluarameitile	1691-90-3
CCl_{2}F_{2}	déchlóraidhéafluaraimeatán	75-71-8
CCl_{2}O	fosgéine	75-44-5
CCl_{2}OS	clóiríd chlóracairbóinilsuilféinile	2757-23-5
CCl_{2}S	déchlóiríd charbóitíoch	463-71-8
CCl_{2}S_{2}	Clóiríd chlóratífhoirmilsuilféinile	72087-91-3
CCl_{3}	frithghníomhaí tríchlóraimeitile	3170-80-7
CCl_{3}F	tríchlóramonafluaraimeatán	75-69-4
CCl_{3}NO_{2}	clóraipicrín	76-06-2
CCl_{4}	teitreaclóiríd charbóin	56-23-5
CCs_{2}O_{3}	[déchaesiam carbónáit]]	29703-01-3
CCuN	ciainíd chopair	544-92-3
CEuN	Ciainíd eoipiam	50647-38-6
CF	fluaraimeitilidín	3889-75-6
CFN	fluairíd chiainigin	1495-50-7
CFO	frithghníomhaí fluarafhoirmile	1871-24-5
CF_{2}	Déafluaraimeitiléin	2154-59-8
CF_{2}NOP	Déafluairíd fosfairisicianaitídeach	461-59-6
CF_{2}NP	Déafluairíd fosfairiciainídeach	14118-40-2
CF_{2}N_{2}	Déafluaraiocianaimíd	7127-18-6
CF_{2}N_{2}O_{4}	Déafluaraidhéanítreameatán	1185-11-1
CF_{2}O	Fluairíd chairbóinile	353-50-4
CF_{2}S	Fluairíd tíochairbóinile	420-32-6
CF_{3}	Frithghníomhaí trífluarameitile	2264-21-3
CF_{3}NO	Trífluaranítreasóimeatáne	334-99-6
CF_{3}NO_{4}	Pearocsaníotráit trífluarameitile	50311-48-3
CF_{4}	Teitreafhluairíd charbóin	75-73-0
CF_{4}O	Hipeafhluairít trífluarameitile	373-91-1
CF_{5}N	Peinteafhluarameitiolaimín	335-01-3
CF_{5}N_{3}	Peinteafhluaraguanidín	10051-06-6
CF_{6}N_{2}	Heicseafluaraimeatándé-aimín	4394-93-8
CF_{7}N_{3}	Heipteafluaraimeatántrí-aimín	14362-68-6
CF_{8}N_{4}	Ochtbhfluaraimeatáinteitreamín	17125-65-4
CGaN	Monaciainíd gailliam	51750-59-5
CGe	Monacairbíd ghearmáiniam	12334-26-8
CGeSi	Cairbíd silicíd ghearmáiniam	12011-72-2
CGe_{3}	Tríghearmáiniam monacairbíd	61349-30-2
CH	Frithghníomhaí meitilidín	3315-37-5
CHBrClF	Brómaclórafluaraimeatán	593-98-6
CHBr_{2}	Frithghníomhaí débhrómaimeitile	14362-13-1
CHCl	Clóraimeitiléin	2108-20-5
CHClF	Frithghníomhaí clórafluarameitile	33272-71-8
CHClO	Clóiríd fhoirmile	2565-30-2
CHCl_{2}	Frithghníomhaí déchlóraimeitile	3474-12-2
CHCl_{3}	Clórafoirm	67-66-3
CHCl_{3}O_{2}S	Clóiríd déchlóraimeatánsuilfóinile	41197-29-9
CHCl_{5}Si	Déchlóraimeitil tríchlóra siláin	1558-24-3
CHF	Fluaraimeitiléin	13453-52-6
CHFN_{2}O_{4}	Fluaraidhéanítreameatán	7182-87-8
CHFO	Clóiríd fhoirmile	1493-02-3
CHF_{2}	Frithghníomhaí déchlóraimeitile	2670-13-5
CHF_{3}	trifluoromethane	75-46-7
CHF_{3}S	trifluoromethanethiol	1493-15-8
CHLiO_{2}	lithium formate	556-63-8
CHLiO_{2}	lithium formate	6108-23-2
CHN	hydrogen cyanide	74-90-8
CHN	hydrogen isocyanide	6914-07-4
CHNO	cyanic acid	420-05-3
CHNO	fulminic acid	506-85-4
CHNO	isocyanic acid	75-13-8
CHNS	isothiocyanic acid	3129-90-6
CHNaO_{2}	sodium formate	141-53-7
CHO	formyl radical	2597-44-6
CHO_{2}	hydrocarboxyl radical	2564-86-5
CHO_{2}Rb	rubidium formate	3495-35-0
CHO_{2}Tl	thallium formate	992-98-3
CHP	methinophosphide	6829-52-3
CHS	thioformyl radical	36058-28-3
CH_{2}	methylene	2465-56-7
CH_{2}Br	bromomethyl radical	16519-97-4
CH_{2}BrI	bromoiodomethane	557-68-6
CH_{2}BrNO_{2}	bromonitromethane	563-70-2
CH_{2}Cl	chloromethyl radical	6806-86-6
CH_{2}ClI	chloroiodomethane	593-71-5
CH_{2}ClNO_{2}	chloronitromethane	1794-84-9
CH_{2}Cl_{2}	methylene chloride	75-09-2
CH_{2}Cl_{2}O_{2}S	chloromethanesulfonyl chloride	3518-65-8
CH_{2}F	fluoromethyl radical	3744-29-4
CH_{2}F_{2}O_{4}S_{2}	methanedisulfonyl fluoride	42148-23-2
CH_{2}N_{2}	cyanamide	420-04-2
CH_{2}N_{2}O_{4}	dinitromethane	625-76-3
CH_{2}N_{6}O_{2}	nitroguanylazide	62154-79-4
CH_{2}O	formaldehyde	50-00-0
CH_{2}O	hydroxymethylene	19710-56-6
CH_{2}O	polyoxymethylene	9002-81-7
CH_{2}OS	sulfine	40100-16-1
CH_{2}O_{2}	dioxirane	157-26-6
CH_{2}O_{2}	formic acid	64-18-6
CH_{2}O_{3}	carbonic acid	463-79-6
CH_{2}S	thioformaldehyde	865-36-1
CH_{3}	methyl radical	2229-07-4
CH_{3}AsCl_{2}	methyldichloroarsine	593-89-5
CH_{3}BBrClO	methoxybromochloroborane	38481-11-7
CH_{3}BBrFO	methoxybromofluoroborane	38481-08-2
CH_{3}BBr_{2}	methylboron dibromide	17933-16-3
CH_{3}BBr_{2}S	methylthiodibromoborane	30009-65-5
CH_{3}BClFO	methoxychlorofluoroborane	38481-06-0
CH_{3}BCl_{2}	methyldichloroborane	7318-78-7
CH_{3}BCl_{2}O	methoxydichloroborane	867-46-9
CH_{3}BCl_{2}S	methylthiothichlroborane	29878-05-5
CH_{3}BFIO	fluoroiodomethoxyborane	38481-10-6
CH_{3}BF_{2}O	methoxydifluoroborane	381-59-9
CH_{3}BF_{2}S	methylthiodifluoroborane	381-60-2
CH_{3}BI_{2}O	methoxydiiodoborane	29878-00-0
CH_{3}BI_{2}S	methylthiodiiodoborane	27545-34-2
CH_{3}Br	methyl bromide	74-83-9
CH_{3}Cl	methyl chloride	74-87-3
CH_{3}ClFOP	methylphosphonyl chlorofluoride	753-71-9
CH_{3}ClO	methyl hypochlorite	593-78-2
CH_{3}ClO_{2}S	methanesulfonyl chloride	124-63-0
CH_{3}ClS	methanesulfenylchloride	5813-48-9
CH_{3}Cl_{2}OP	methoxy dichloro phosphine	3279-26-3
CH_{3}Cl_{2}OP	methyl phosphonic dichloride	676-97-1
CH_{3}Cl_{2}OPS	methylthiophosphorylchloride	18281-76-0
CH_{3}Cl_{2}O_{2}P	methyl dichlorophosphate	677-24-7
CH_{3}Cl_{2}P	methyldichlorophosphine	676-83-5
CH_{3}Cl_{2}PS	methylphosphonothioic dichloride	676-98-2
CH_{3}Cl_{3}Ge	methylgermanium trichloride	993-10-2
CH_{3}D	deuteriomethane 1	676-49-3
CH_{3}F	methyl fluoride	593-53-3
CH_{3}FO	methyl hypofluorite	36336-08-0
CH_{3}FO_{2}S	methanesulfonyl fluoride	558-25-8
CH_{3}F_{2}OP	methylphosphonyl difluoride	676-99-3
CH_{3}I	methyl iodide	74-88-4
CH_{3}IS	methylsulfenyliodide	86381-89-7
CH_{3}N	methanimine	2053-29-4
CH_{3}NO	formamide	75-12-7
CH_{3}NO_{2}	methyl nitrite	624-91-9
CH_{3}NO_{3}	methyl nitrate	598-58-3
CH_{3}NS	methanethioamide	115-08-2
CH_{3}NSi	isocyano silane	18081-38-4
CH_{3}N_{3}	methyl azide	624-90-8
CH_{3}N_{3}O_{3}	nitrourea	556-89-8
CH_{3}N_{3}O_{4}	methyldinitramine	25346-05-8
CH_{3}NaO	sodium methoxide	124-41-4
CH_{3}O	hydroxymethyl radical	2597-43-5
CH_{3}O	methoxy radical	2143-68-2
CH_{3}P	phosphethene	61183-53-7
CH_{3}S	mercaptomethyl radical	17032-46-1
CH_{3}S	methylthio radical	7175-75-9
CH_{3}S_{2}	methyldithio radical	29245-72-5
CH_{3}Sn	monomethyl tin radical	23001-26-5
CH_{3}Zn	methyl zinc	42217-98-1
CH_{4}	methane	74-82-8
CH_{4}Cl_{2}Si	methyl dichlorosilane	20156-50-7
CH_{4}N	methyl amino radical	49784-84-1
CH_{4}N_{2}	methyl diazene	26981-93-1
CH_{4}N_{2}O	formic acid hydrazide	624-84-0
CH_{4}N_{2}O	urea	57-13-6
CH_{4}N_{2}O_{2}S	aminoiminomethanesulfinic acid	1758-73-2
CH_{4}N_{2}S	ammonium thiocyanate	1762-95-4
CH_{4}N_{2}S	thiourea	62-56-6
CH_{4}N_{2}Se	selenourea	630-10-4
CH_{4}O	methyl alcohol	67-56-1
CH_{4}OS	methanesulfenic acid	62965-22-4
CH_{4}O_{2}	methanediol	463-57-0
CH_{4}O_{2}	methyl peroxide	3031-73-0
CH_{4}O_{2}S	methanesulfinic acid	17696-73-0
CH_{4}O_{3}	Orthoformic acid	463-78-5
CH_{4}O_{4}	Orthocarbonic acid	463-84-3
CH_{4}O_{6}S_{2}	methane disulfonic acid	503-40-2
CH_{4}S	methanethiol	74-93-1
CH_{4}S_{2}	dimercaptomethane	6725-64-0
CH_{4}S_{2}	methyl hydrogen disulfide	6251-26-9
CH_{5}As	methylarsine	593-52-2
CH_{5}AsO_{3}	methyl arsonic acid	124-58-3
CH_{5}BO_{2}	dihydroxymethylborane	13061-96-6
CH_{5}N	methylamine	74-89-5
CH_{5}NO_{2}S	methane sulfonamide	3144-09-0
CH_{5}NO_{3}S	aminomethanesulfonic acid	13881-91-9
CH_{5}N_{3}	guanidine	113-00-8
CH_{5}N_{3}O_{3}S	thiourea nitrate	55011-91-1
CH_{5}N_{3}S	hydrazinecarbothioamide	79-19-6
CH_{5}N_{4}O_{2}	guanidine nitrate	506-93-4
CH_{5}O_{3}P	methylphosphonic acid	993-13-5
CH_{6}ClN	methylammonium chloride	593-51-1
CH_{6}ClN_{3}O	semicarbazide hydrochloride	563-41-7
CH_{6}Ge	methyl germane	1449-65-6
CH_{6}IN	methylammonium iodide	14965-49-2
CH_{6}N	methylammonium radical	17000-00-9
CH_{6}N_{2}	methylhydrazine	60-34-4
CH_{6}N_{2}O_{2}	ammonium carbamate	1111-78-0
CH_{6}N_{4}	aminoguanidine	79-17-4
CH_{6}N_{4}O	carbonic dihydrazide	497-18-7
CH_{6}N_{4}S	carbonothioic dihydrazide	2231-57-4
CH_{7}N_{3}O_{3}	methylhydrazinium nitrate	29674-96-2
CHf	hafnium(IV) carbide	506-64-9
CI_{4}	carbon tetraiodide	507-25-5
CIN	cyanogen iodide	506-78-5
CINO	iodine isocyanate	3607-48-5
CINS	iodine thiocyanate	105918-65-8
CINSe	iodine selenocyanate	105918-66-9
CIN_{3}O_{6}	iodotrinitromethane	630-70-6
CIr	iridium monocarbide	12385-37-4
CKN	potassium cyanide	151-50-8
CKNS	potassium thiocyanate	333-20-0
CK_{2}O_{3}	potassium carbonate	584-08-7
CLi_{2}O_{3}	lithium carbonate	554-13-2
CLi_{3}	trilithium monocarbide	70378-93-7
CLi_{4}	carbon tetralithium	38827-79-1
CMgO_{3}	magnesium carbonate	546-93-0
CMo	molybdenum carbide	12011-97-1
CN	cyano radical	2074-87-5
CNNa	sodium cyanide	143-33-9
CNO	isocyanato radical	22400-26-6
CNOSi	oxosilyl monocyanide	29210-67-1
CNPr	praseodymium monocyanide	57137-34-5
CNS	thiocyanato radical	15941-77-2
CNSi	silicon monocyanide	29210-66-0
CN_{2}O	nitrosyl cyanide	4343-68-4
CN_{4}	cyanogen azide	764-05-6
CNaHO_{3}	Sodium bicarbonate	144-55-8
CNa_{2}O_{3}	sodium carbonate	497-19-8
CO	carbon monoxide	630-08-0
COS	carbonyl sulfide	463-58-1
COSe	carbonyl selenide	1603-84-5
CO_{2}	carbon dioxide	124-38-9
CO_{3}	carbon trioxide	3812-32-6
CP	carbon monophosphide	12326-85-1
CPSi	silicon monocarbide monophosphide	37342-74-8
CP_{2}	carbon diphosphide	12601-93-3
CRh	rhodium monocarbide	12127-42-3
CRu	ruthenium carbide	12012-13-4
CS	carbon monosulfide	2944-05-0
CSSe	thiocarbonyl selenide	5951-19-9
CS_{2}	carbon disulfide cation	12539-80-9
CS_{2}	carbon disulfide	75-15-0
CSe	carbon monoselenide	16674-18-3
CSe_{2}	carbon diselenide	506-80-9
CSi	silicon monocarbide	409-21-2
CSi_{2}	disilicon carbide	12070-04-1
CSi_{3}	trisilicon carbide	12326-86-2
CTa	tantalum carbide	12070-06-3
CTh	thorium monocarbide	12012-16-7
CTi	titanium carbide	12070-08-5
CU	uranium monocarbide	12070-09-6
CW	tungsten carbide	12070-12-1
CZr	zirconium carbide	12070-14-3

== C+H+O compounds ==
Each hydrogen added to a molecule can be considered as a proton plus a one-electron reduction of the redox state, while each oxygen counts as a two-electron oxidation. Thus a net addition of H_{2}O is a simple hydration with no net change in redox state and frequently occurs reversibly in aqueous solution. These relationships may be viewed in the following table (peroxides and ions are excluded; unstable or hypothetical compounds are italicized).

	O_{0}	O_{1}	O_{2}	O_{3}	O_{4}
H_{4}	methane	methanol	methanediol	orthoformic acid	orthocarbonic acid
H_{3}	methyl radical	methoxy radical			
H_{2}	methylene	formaldehyde	formic acid	carbonic acid	
H_{1}	methylidyne radical				
H_{0}	atomic carbon	carbon monoxide	carbon dioxide	carbon trioxide	carbon tetroxide

== See also ==
- Carbon number
- List of compounds with carbon number 2
