= Carbon hexoxide =

- Skeletal formula of carbon hexoxide

Names
- IUPAC name pentaoxan-6-one

Identifiers
CAS Number	1009636-22-9
3D model (JSmol)	Interactive image
PubChem CID	18694685
- InChI: InChI=1S/CO6/c2-1-3-5-7-6-4-1 Key: UMNKSLFSKMBRFI-UHFFFAOYSA-N
- SMILES: O=C1OOOOO1

Properties
Chemical formula	CO_{6}
Molar mass	108.005 g·mol^{−1}

Related compounds
Related compounds	Carbon pentoxide Carbon tetroxide Carbon hexasulfide
- Except where otherwise noted, data are given for materials in their standard state (at 25 °C [77 °F], 100 kPa). Infobox references

Carbon hexoxide or carbon hexaoxide is an oxide of carbon with an unusually large proportion of oxygen. The molecule has been produced and studied at cryogenic temperatures. The molecule is important in atmospheric chemistry and in the study of cold ices in the outer solar system and interstellar space. The substance could form and be present on Ganymede or Triton, moons in the outer solar system. The molecule consists of a six membered ring with five oxygen and one carbon atom, and one oxygen with a double bond with the carbon.

== Shape ==
The molecule that has been observed has a C_{s} symmetry. The ring is not a flat hexagon but puckered with slightly different side lengths and angles (120°) from the regular hexagon. Going around the ring starting at the carbon to oxygen bond the interatomic distances are C–O: 1.362 Å O–O 1.491 Å, O–O 1.391 Å, O–O 1.391 Å, O–O 1.491 Å, and O–C 1.362 Å. The angles between the bonds are: O–C–O 120.4 °, C–O–O 115.7°, O–O–O 105.9°, and the opposite from carbon O–O–O 104.1°. For the double carbon to oxygen bond, the length is 1.185 Å and the angle from the single bonds is 119.6°.

== Formation ==
In an experiment, carbon hexoxide was formed by irradiating solid carbon dioxide with electrons at an energy of 5000 eV at 10 K in a vacuum. The reaction proceeds by breaking atomic oxygen from carbon dioxide:

CO_{2} → CO + O

The atomic oxygen then reacts with carbon dioxide to form carbon trioxide, and similar reactions occur to generate the series of ring oxides carbon tetroxide and carbon pentoxide, ultimately leading to the formation of carbon hexoxide in an exothermic reaction.

CO_{2} + O → O_{2}CO
O_{2}CO + O → O_{3}CO
O_{3}CO + O → O_{4}CO
O_{4}CO + O → O_{5}CO ΔH = −145.2 kJ mol^{−1}

== Properties ==
Carbon hexoxide is stable up to 60 K. Vibrational infrared wavenumbers include the most prominent ν_{1} = 1876 cm^{−1} for the most common isotopologue ^{12}C^{16}O_{6}.

== Other isomers ==
Other possible isomers of carbon hexoxide are the C_{2} form with a five and three membered ring, and the D_{2d} with two four membered rings. The D_{2d} O_{3}CO_{3} isomer has a calculated C–O bond length of 1.391 Å, and an O–O length of 1.469 Å. The O–C–O bond angle is 94.1°. However these two isomers have not been observed.

The equivalent carbon hexasulfide is also known from inert gas matrix study. It has C_{2} symmetry with the same atomic arrangement as the hexoxide.
