= N-methylalanine dehydrogenase =

Enzyme

Identifiers
- EC no.: 1.4.1.17
- CAS no.: 56379-51-2

Databases
- IntEnz: IntEnz view
- BRENDA: BRENDA entry
- ExPASy: NiceZyme view
- KEGG: KEGG entry
- MetaCyc: metabolic pathway
- PRIAM: profile
- PDB structures: RCSB PDB PDBe PDBsum
- Gene Ontology: AmiGO / QuickGO
Search
- PMC: articles
- PubMed: articles
- NCBI: proteins

In enzymology, N-methylalanine dehydrogenase (EC 1.4.1.17) is an enzyme that catalyzes the chemical reaction

N-methyl-alanine
+ NADP^{+}
H_{2}O
H^{+}
H_{2}O
H^{+}
pyruvic acid
+ NADPH +
methylamine

The three substrates of this enzyme are N-methyl-L-alanine, water, and oxidised nicotinamide adenine dinucleotide phosphate (NADP^{+}). Its products are pyruvic acid, methylamine, reduced NADPH, and a proton.

This enzyme belongs to the family of oxidoreductases, specifically those acting on the CH-NH_{2} group of donors with NAD^{+} or NADP^{+} as acceptor. The systematic name of this enzyme class is N-methyl-L-alanine:NADP^{+} oxidoreductase (demethylating, deaminating).
