= Negative air ions =

Negatively charged ions in the air

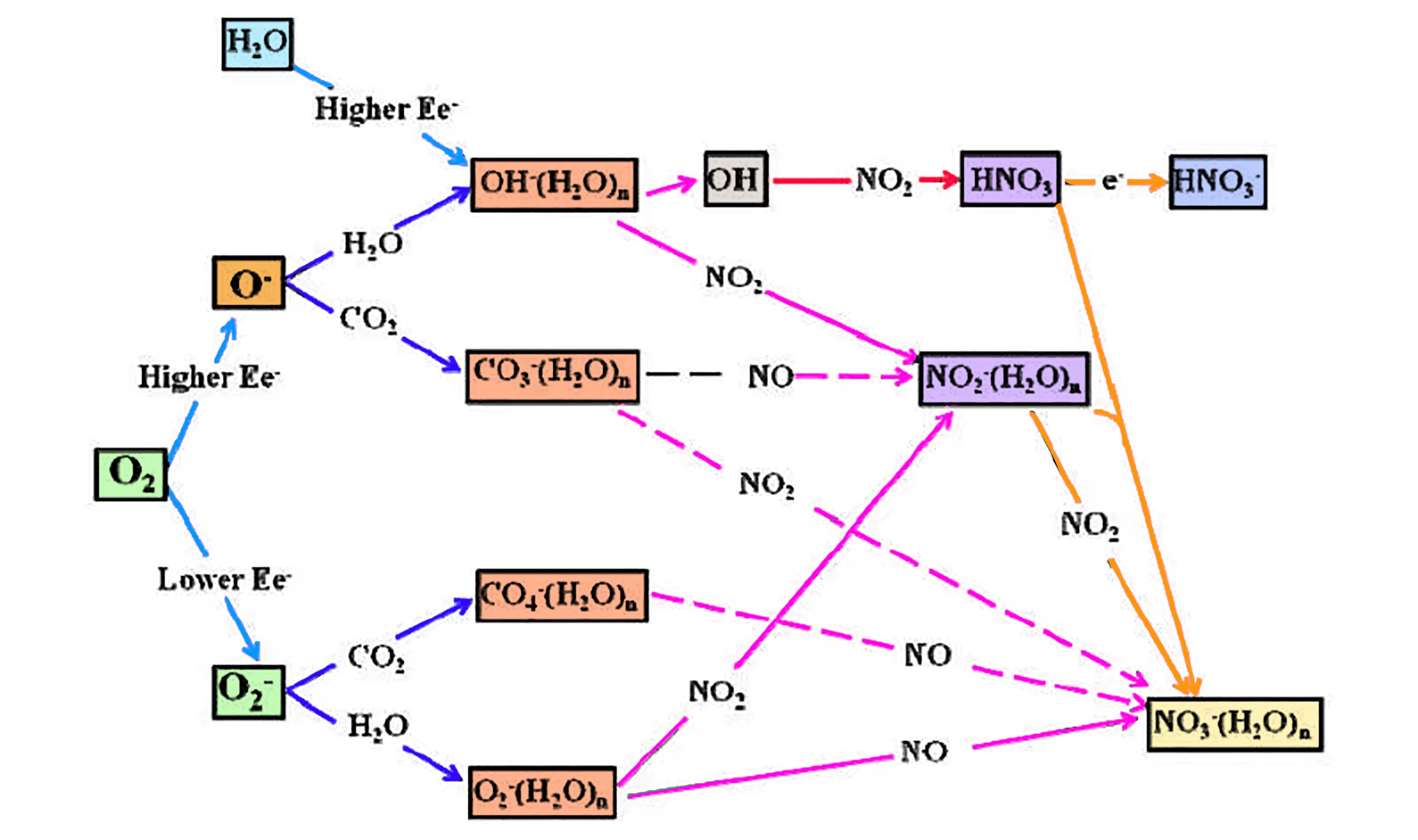
Negative ion reaction equations

Negative air ions (NAI) are negatively charged single gas molecules or ion clusters in the air. They play a role in maintaining the charge balance of the atmosphere. The main components of air are molecular nitrogen and oxygen. Due to the strong electronegativity of oxygen and oxygen-containing molecules, they can easily capture electrons to form negatively charged air ions, most of which are superoxide radicals ·O_{2}^{−}, so NAI are mainly composed of negative oxygen ions, also called air negative oxygen ions.

The ions can be produced by natural means such as lightning, or artificially by methods such as a corona discharge. They can play a role in electrostatic removal of air particulates both for industrial applications and with indoor air, and there are claims that they have a beneficial health effect although the evidence for this is weak.

== Generation mechanism ==
Various negative air ions are formed by combining active neutral molecules and electrons in the gas through a series of ion-molecule reactions.

In the air, due to the presence of many water molecules, the negative air ions typically combine with water to form hydrated negative air ions, such as O^{−}·(H_{2}O)n, O_{2}^{−}·(H_{2}O)n, O_{3}^{−}·(H_{2}O)n, OH^{−}·(H_{2}O)n, CO_{3}^{−}·(H_{2}O)n, HCO_{3}^{−}·(H_{2}O)n, CO_{4}^{−}·(H_{2}O)n, NO_{2}^{−}·(H_{2}O)n, NO_{3}^{−}·(H_{2}O)n, etc. The ion clusters formed by the combination of small ions and water molecules have a longer survival period due to their large volume and the fact that the charge is protected by water molecules and is not easy to transfer. This is because in the molecular collision, the larger the molecular volume, the less energy is lost when encountering collisions with other molecules, thereby extending the survival time of negative air ions.

== Generation methods ==
Negative air ions can be produced by two methods: natural or artificial. The methods of producing negative air ions in nature include the waterfall effect, lightning ionization and from plants. Natural methods can produce a large number of negative air ions. The artificial means of producing negative air ions include corona discharge and water vapour. Compared with the negative air ions produced in nature, although artificial methods can produce high levels of negative air ions, there are differences in the types and concentrations of negative air ions.

=== Natural environments ===
==== Waterfall method ====
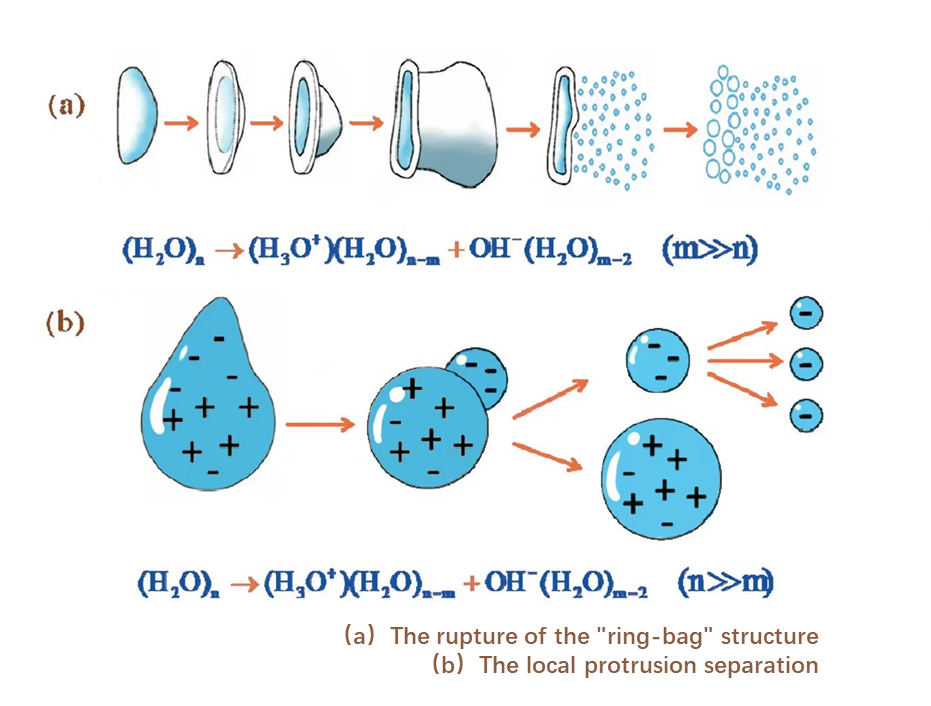
The Lenard Effect

The mechanism of producing negative air ions by the waterfall method connects to the generation of static electricity due to water droplets hitting surfaces, first discovered by Philipp Lenard in 1892 and now called the spray electrification or waterfall effect. Falling water generates static electricity either by collisions between water drops or with the ground, leading to the finer mist in updrafts being mainly negatively charged, with positive near the lower surface. It can also occur for sliding drops. The experimental fact that charging occurs is very well documented, although details of the exact process remain a topic of debate. High speed video observations show how water spray can breakup into different droplets. Larger droplets tend to be positively charged, while smaller ones negative; this charge separation is also well documented for solids. For instance it occurs in commercial powder processing and in natural processes such as dust storms, There can be electric fields of up to 160kV/m with moderate wind conditions, which leads to Coulomb forces of about the same magnitude as gravity.

There can also be contributions from contact potential differences between liquids or gases and other materials, similar to the work function differences for solids. It has been suggested that a triboelectric series for liquids is useful. One difference from solids is that often liquids have charged double layers, and most of the work to date supports that ion transfer (rather than electron) dominates for liquids as first suggested by Irving Langmuir in 1938.

All these processes will lead to charges, relatively high electric fields and these in turn can lead to the formation of gaseous ions.

==== Lightning strike ====
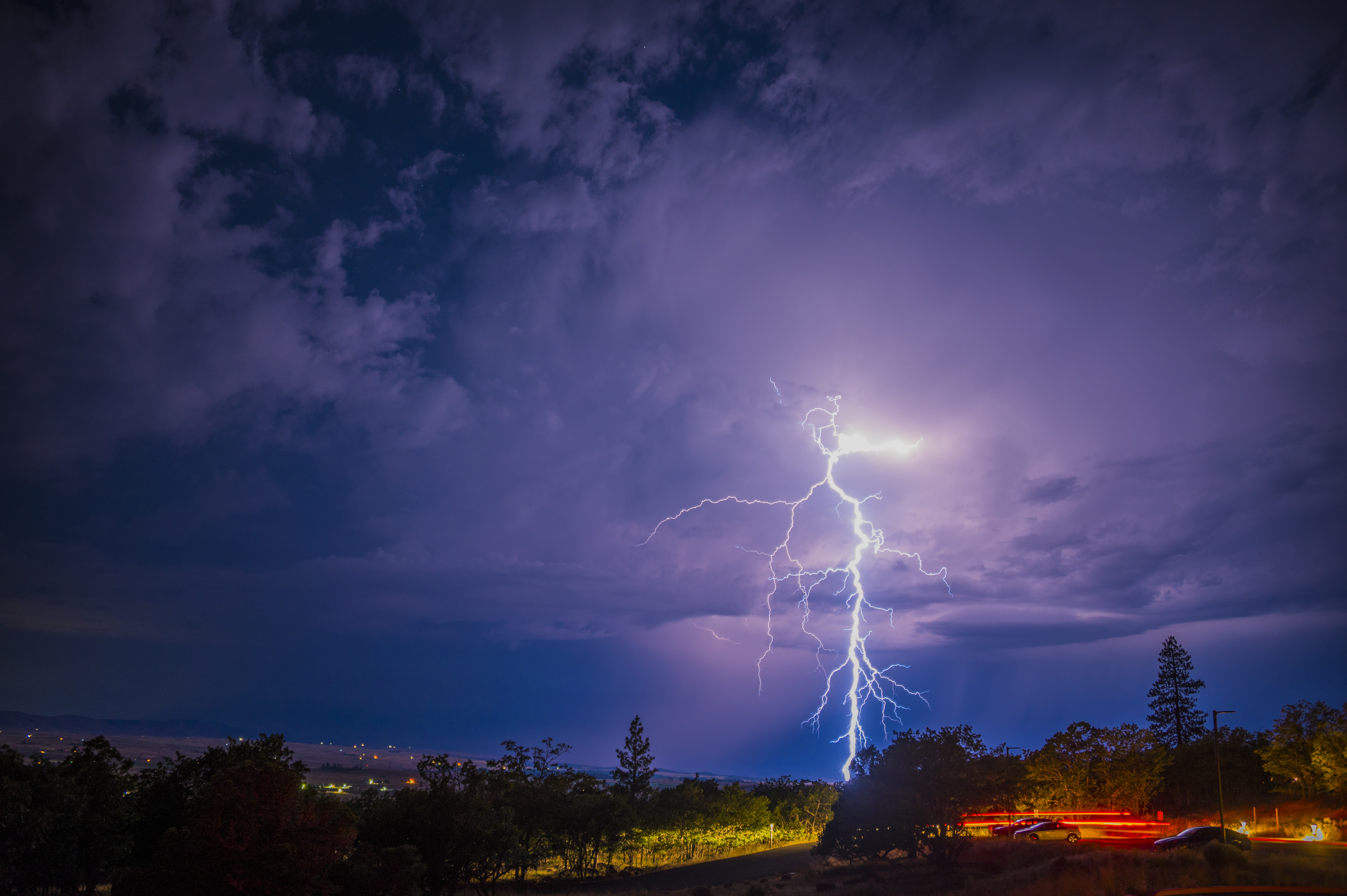
An intense cloud-to-ground lightning strike

In the atmosphere positive and negative charges will accumulate above and below the clouds. One of the most commonly cited ways that charge separation is generated is via the collisions of different forms of solid ice, for instance graupel and ice particles. Similar to the collisions between other types of particles mentioned above, the ice particles become positively charged and the graupel negative. The two have different densities, with the ice particles tending to rise and the graupel fall or move towards the center of the storm.

This charge separation in different regions of the clouds leads to large electric fields. When the electric field strength between the cloud and the ground or different parts of a storm exceeds the dielectric strength of the air, discharge will occur and break through the air. During the lightning discharge process, charged particles bombard the surrounding air molecules, ionizing the molecules to generate negative air ions. At the moment of the lightning strike, hundreds of millions of negative air ions will be generated.

==== Plant discharge ====
The leaves of vegetation, particularly indoor plants can lead to ions. The rate is low, can be increased by applying electric fields and there are indications that it can be enhanced at the tips of leaves although there are also physiological factors. The light exposure conditions also play a role, with an exponential dependence on the illumination intensity. Bioreactor have been explored which can produce levels of ions that could be useful for reducing particular contaminants.

=== Artificial ionization ===
==== Corona discharge method ====
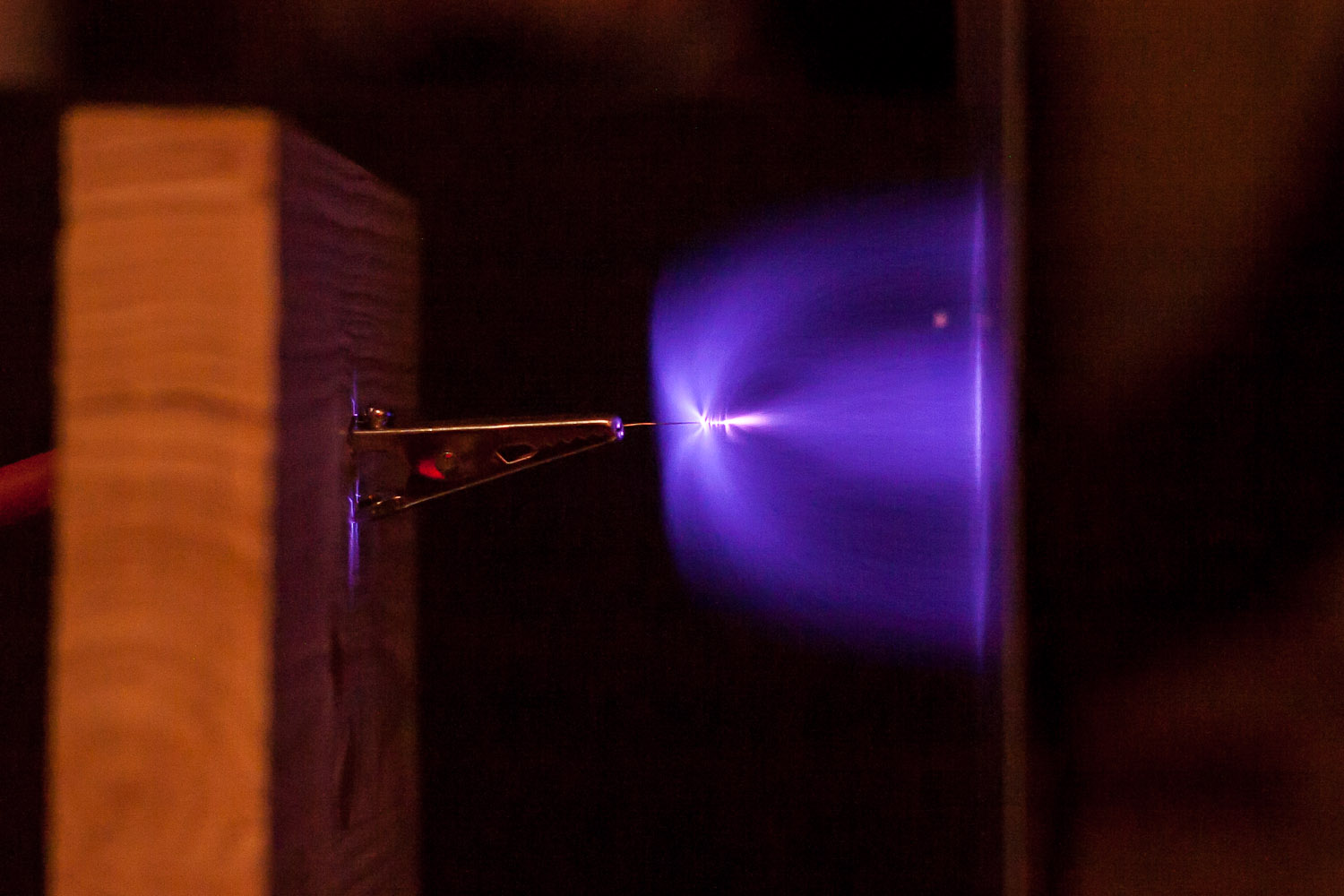
Corona Discharge

Currently, the most common artificial method is to use corona discharge to produce negative ions. The specific process of using corona discharge to produce gaseous negative ions is to connect the high-voltage negative electrode to a thin needle-shaped wire or a conductor with a very small radius of curvature, so that a strong electric field is generated near the electrode, releasing electrons. The electrons to collide with gas molecules, and produce new free electrons and positive ions. The newly generated free electrons will repeat the previous process, and this process will be repeated.

==== The water vapour method ====
The water vapour method refers to the use of artificial technology and modern instruments to simulate the process of charging via the waterfall effect, using high-speed airflow to collide with water droplets, dispersing larger water droplets into a large number of microdroplets. As the water droplet dispersion occurs, the Leonard effect is active, generating negative ions. The air moving past the water droplets may also lead to triboelectric charging, similar to aircraft "precipitation static" or "P-static"; aircraft typically have one or more static wicks to remove this.

== Detection ==
Detection of negative air ions is divided into measurement and identification. NAI measurement can be achieved by measuring the change in atmospheric conductivity when NAI pass through a conductive tube. NAI identification is typically performed by mass spectrometry, which can effectively identify a variety of negative ions, including O^{−},O_{2}^{−},O_{3}^{−},CO_{3}^{−},HCO_{3}^{−},NO_{3}^{−}, etc.

== Application of negative air ions ==
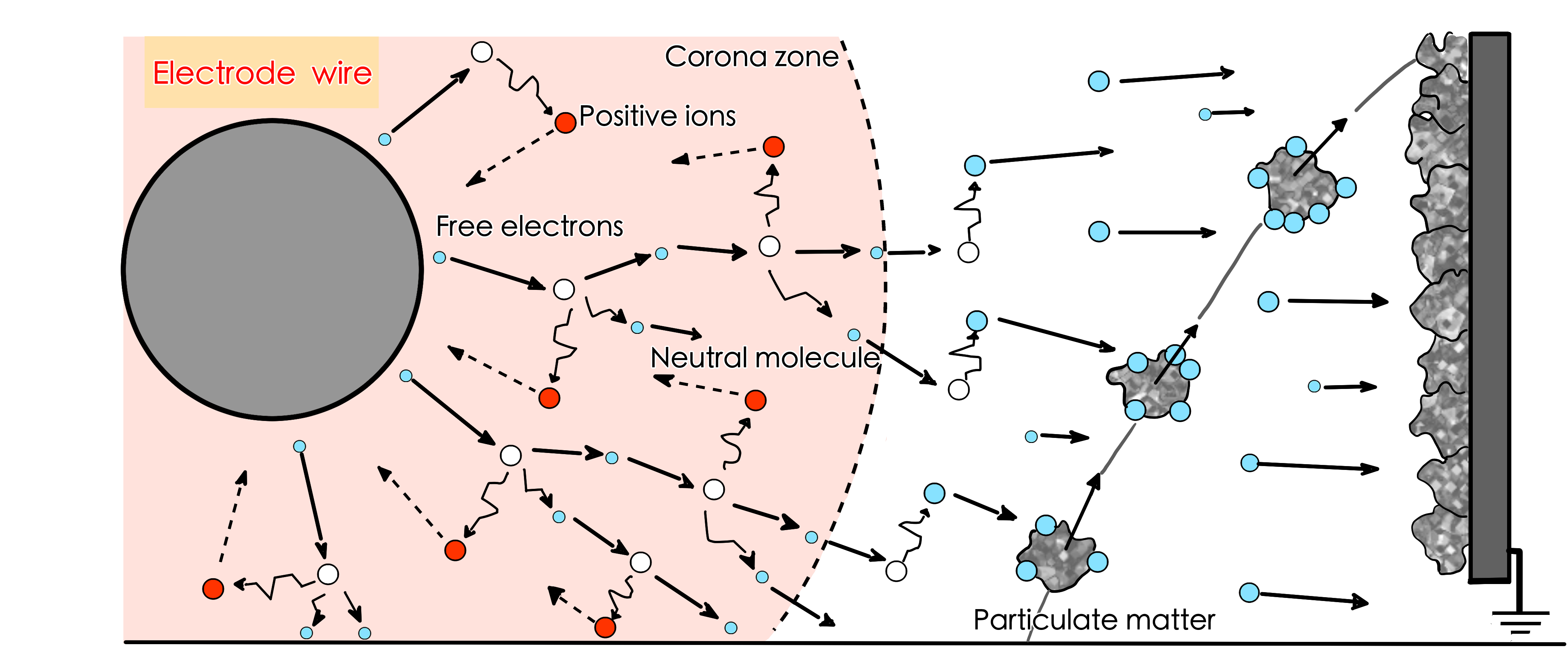
Negative air ions help precipitate particulate matter

=== Environmental improvement ===
Negative air ions are a component of electrostatic filters which are used to remove dust and particulate pollutants (PM) both in industry and for indoor pollutants. One area that has been studied is the use of a corona-negative ions generator in experiments on particles sedimentation through three steps: charging, migration, and sedimentation. It has been found that charged PM will settle faster or sink faster under the action of gravity so that PM will settle/precipitate faster than uncharged PM. In addition, experimental studies have shown that negative air ions have a specific degradation effect on chloroform, toluene, and 1,5-Hexadiene and produce carbon dioxide and water as final products through chemical reactions.

=== Negative ion therapy ===
Negative air ionization therapy uses air ionisers as a non-pharmaceutical treatment for respiratory disease, allergy, or stress-related health conditions. As a preventative approach to help reduce pollutants as described above they have a role. In addition to this there are claims that they have a very specific role by themselves, with many articles on this in the popular science literature. However, detailed reviews ot the evidence indicates that many of these treatments using NAIs have minimal demonstrated heath benefits. For instance, in 2018 Jiang et.al. wrote "The presence of NAIs is credited for increasing psychological health, productivity, and overall well-being but without consistent or reliable evidence in therapeutic effects and with controversy in anti-microorganisms,"

== See also ==
- Air ioniser – Electrical device to ionise air molecules
- Ion – Particle, atom or molecule with a net electrical charge
- Static electricity – Imbalance of electric charges within or on the surface of a material
- Triboelectric effect – Charge transfer due to contact or sliding
