= Carbon pentoxide =

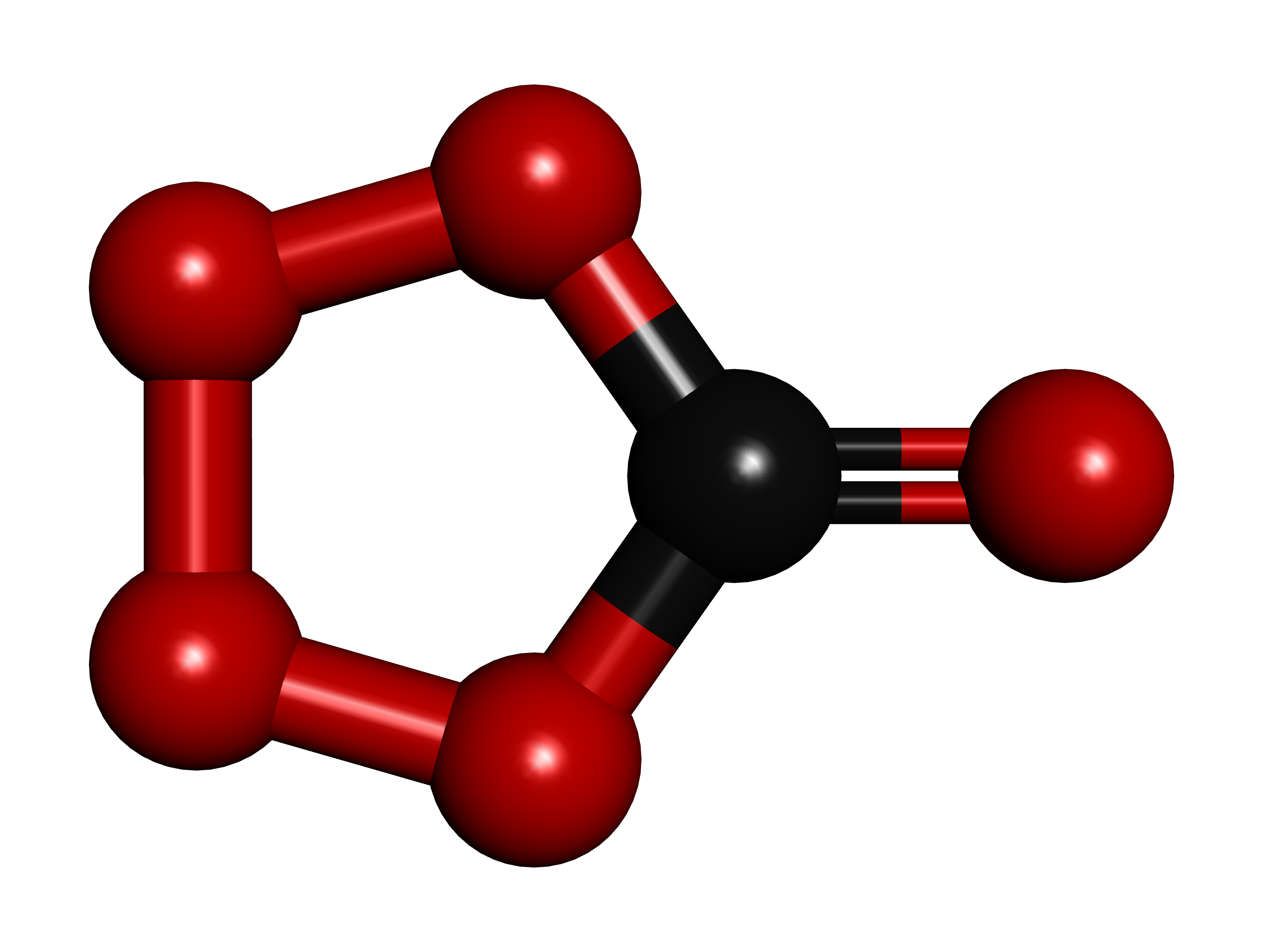
- carbon pentoxide model

Names
- IUPAC name tetraoxolan-5-one

Identifiers
CAS Number	853179-45-0
3D model (JSmol)	Interactive image
PubChem CID	22173730
CompTox Dashboard (EPA)	DTXSID101336360
- InChI: InChI=1S/CO5/c2-1-3-5-6-4-1 Key: CTQBRSUCLFHKGM-UHFFFAOYSA-N
- SMILES: O=C1OOOO1

Properties
Chemical formula	CO_{5}
Molar mass	92.01 g/mol

Related compounds
Related compounds	Carbon hexoxide Carbon tetroxide
- Except where otherwise noted, data are given for materials in their standard state (at 25 °C [77 °F], 100 kPa). Infobox references

Carbon pentaoxide, carbon pentoxide or tetraoxolan-5-one is an unstable molecular oxide of carbon. The molecule has been produced and studied at cryogenic temperatures. The molecule is important in atmospheric chemistry and in the study of cold ices in the outer solar system and interstellar space. The substance could form and be present on Ganymede or Triton, moons in the outer solar system.

The molecule has a C_{2} symmetry. It consists of a five membered ring with one carbon and four oxygen atoms. A fifth oxygen atom has a double bond to the carbon. Calculation has resulted in a theoretical structure. The pentagon is not regular, but varies in the length of its sides and angles. The distance between the oxygen atoms that are not attached to carbon is 1.406 Å, whereas the distance between one of these atoms and an oxygen attached to carbon is 1.457 Å. The carbon oxygen bond length is 1.376 Å. The double carbon to oxygen bond is the shortest at 1.180 Å. There is no carbon-to-carbon bond as there is only one carbon atom. The OOO bond angle is 100.2° and the OOC angle is 109.1°. The OCO bond angle is 125.4°.

== Production ==
Carbon pentaoxide was produced by irradiating cryogenically frozen carbon dioxide with 5 keV electrons. The reaction mechanism is by carbon tetroxide reacting with an oxygen atom. This reaction releases 17.0 kJmol^{−1}. Formation from ozone and carbon dioxide is energetically unfavourable by 165.6 kJmol^{−1}, and carbon trioxide reacting with dioxygen molecules also would require 31.6 kJmol^{−1}.

== Properties ==
Vibrational infrared wavenumbers include the most prominent ν_{1} 1912 cm^{−1} for the most common isotopologue ^{12}C^{16}O_{5}. Potential routes for decomposition are by forming carbon dioxide and ozone, or carbon monoxide and oxygen, or carbon trioxide and oxygen. Carbon pentaoxide is less volatile than carbon dioxide, remaining stable and solid until about 106K.

An alternative theoretical structure, termed C_{2v}, has a spiro structure with one four-member ring and a three-member ring tied perpendicularly at the carbon atom. However, this is 166 kJmol^{−1} higher in energy than the C_{2} isomer, and thus less likely to be formed. This isomer has not been detected.

The equivalent carbon pentasulfide is also known from inert gas matrix. It has C_{2} symmetry with the same atomic topology as the pentoxide.
