= Pseudooxynicotine oxidase =

Identifiers
- EC no.: 1.4.2.3

Databases
- BRENDA: enzyme data
- ExPASy: NiceZyme view
- KEGG: enzyme entry
- MetaCyc: metabolic pathway
- Rhea: reactions
- PDB structures: RCSB PDB PDBe PDBsum
Search
- PMC: articles
- PubMed: articles
- NCBI: proteins

Pseudooxynicotine oxidase (EC 1.4.2.3) is an enzyme with systematic name 4-(methylamino)-1-(pyridin-3-yl)butan-1-one:oxygen oxidoreductase (methylamine releasing). This enzyme catalyses the following chemical reaction

pseudooxynicotine
+ 2 ferricytochrome c
H_{2}O
2 H^{+}
H_{2}O
2 H^{+}
4-oxo-4-(3-pyridinebutanal)
+ 2 ferrocytochrome c + CH_{3}NH_{2}

This enzyme contains one non-covalently bound flavin adenine dinucleotide. It is involved in nicotine breakdown in soil bacteria and releases methylamine.
