= N-methyl-2-oxoglutaramate hydrolase =

Class of enzymes

Identifiers
- EC no.: 3.5.1.36
- CAS no.: 9073-53-4

Databases
- BRENDA: enzyme data
- ExPASy: NiceZyme view
- KEGG: enzyme entry
- MetaCyc: metabolic pathway
- Rhea: reactions
- PDB structures: RCSB PDB PDBe PDBsum
- Gene Ontology: AmiGO / QuickGO
Search
- PMC: articles
- PubMed: articles
- NCBI: proteins

N-methyl-2-oxoglutaramate hydrolase (EC 3.5.1.36) is an enzyme that catalyzes the chemical reaction

N-methyl-2-oxoglutaramic acid
H_{2}O
H_{2}O
α-ketoglutaric acid
+ CH_{3}NH_{2}

The enzyme characterised from Pseudomonas species hydrolyses N-methyl-2-oxoglutaramic acid to α-ketoglutaric acid and methylamine. The reaction is reversible and N-methyl-2-oxoglutaramic acid can spontaneously cyclise to 5-hydroxy-N-methylpyroglutamic acid.

This enzyme belongs to the family of hydrolases, those acting on carbon-nitrogen bonds other than peptide bonds, specifically in linear amides. The systematic name of this enzyme class is N-methyl-2-oxoglutaramate methylamidohydrolase. This enzyme is also called 5-hydroxy-N-methylpyroglutamate synthase.
