= Pentoxide =

Pentoxide may refer to:

- Antimony pentoxide, Sb_{2}O_{5}
- Arsenic pentoxide, As_{2}O_{5}
- Carbon pentoxide, CO_{5}
- Dinitrogen pentoxide, N_{2}O_{5}
- Iodine pentoxide, I_{2}O_{5}
- Niobium pentoxide, Nb_{2}O_{5}
- Phosphorus pentoxide, P_{4}O_{10}
- Tantalum pentoxide, Ta_{2}O_{5}
- Tungsten pentoxide, W_{18}O_{49}
