= Methylammonium iodide =

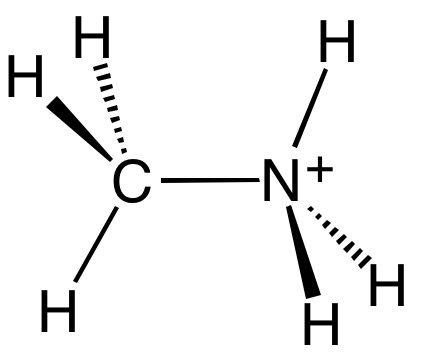
The methylammonium cation
The iodide anion

Names
- IUPAC name Methylazanium iodide
- Systematic IUPAC name Methanaminium iodide
- Other names: Methylamine hydroiodide; Methanamine hydriodide

Identifiers
CAS Number	14965-49-2
3D model (JSmol)	Interactive image
ChemSpider	452756
ECHA InfoCard	100.035.474
EC Number	239-037-4
PubChem CID	519034
CompTox Dashboard (EPA)	DTXSID30933695
- InChI: InChI=1S/CH5N.HI/c1-2;/h2H2,1H3;1H Key: LLWRXQXPJMPHLR-UHFFFAOYSA-N
- SMILES: C[NH3+].[I-]

Properties
Chemical formula	CH_{3}NH_{3}I
Molar mass	158.96951 g/mol
Appearance	White powder

Hazards
- GHS labelling
Pictograms	(GHS07: Exclamation mark)
Signal word	Warning
Hazard statements	H302, H315, H319, H335
Precautionary statements	P261, P264, P270, P271, P280, P301+P312, P302+P352, P304+P340, P305+P351+P338, P312, P321, P330, P332+P313, P337+P313, P362, P403+P233, P405, P501
- Except where otherwise noted, data are given for materials in their standard state (at 25 °C [77 °F], 100 kPa). Infobox references

Methylammonium iodide in an organic halide with a formula of CH_{3}NH_{3}I. It is an ammonium salt composed of methylamine and hydrogen iodide. The primary application for methylammonium iodide, sometimes in combination with other methylammonium halides, is as a component of perovskite (structure) crystalline solar cells.
