= Methylammonium chloride =

Names
- IUPAC name Methylazanium chloride
- Systematic IUPAC name Methanaminium chloride
- Other names: Methylamine hydrochloride

Identifiers
CAS Number	593-51-1
3D model (JSmol)	Interactive image
Abbreviations	MeNH_{3}Cl
ChEBI	CHEBI:59337
ChemSpider	11147
ECHA InfoCard	100.008.906
EC Number	209-795-0
PubChem CID	11637
UNII	M439EX322K
CompTox Dashboard (EPA)	DTXSID30873360
- InChI: InChI=1S/CH5N.ClH/c1-2;/h2H2,1H3;1H Key: NQMRYBIKMRVZLB-UHFFFAOYSA-N
- SMILES: C[NH3+].[Cl-]

Properties
Chemical formula	CH_{6}ClN
Molar mass	67.52 g·mol^{−1}
Appearance	White crystals

Hazards
- Occupational safety and health (OHS/OSH)
Main hazards	irritant
- GHS labelling
Pictograms	(GHS07: Exclamation mark)
Signal word	Warning
Hazard statements	H302, H315, H319, H335
Precautionary statements	P261, P305+P351+P338
- Except where otherwise noted, data are given for materials in their standard state (at 25 °C [77 °F], 100 kPa). Infobox references

Methylammonium chloride is an organic halide with a formula of CH_{6}ClN or CH_{3}NH_{3}Cl. It is an ammonium salt composed of methylamine and hydrogen chloride. One potential application for the methylammonium halides is in the production of perovskite solar cells. The methyl group and other hydrogen atoms are bonded covalently to the nitrogen, with the chloride bonded ionically.
