= Methylammonium halide =

Group of chemical compounds

Methylammonium halides are organic halides with a formula of [CH_{3}NH_{3}]^{+}X^{−}, where X is F for methylammonium fluoride, Cl for methylammonium chloride, Br for methylammonium bromide, or I for methylammonium iodide. Generally they are white or light colored powders.

== Applications ==
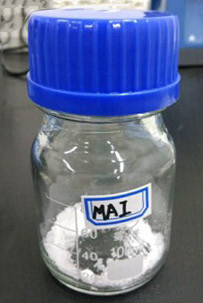
[CH_{3}NH_{3}]I powder

These salts are components of perovskite solar cells, which are being evaluated for commercialization. The iodide is the most commonly used. Magneto-optical data storage concepts are also being testing based on various ammonium halides.

== Production ==
These compounds are usually prepared by combining equimolar amounts of methylamine with the appropriate halide acid. For instance methylammonium iodide is prepared by combining methylamine and hydrogen iodide at 0 °C for 120 minutes followed by evaporation at 60 °C, yielding crystals of methylammonium iodide.

CH_{3}NH_{2} + HI → [CH_{3}NH_{3}]I

== Crystallography ==
These compounds' crystallography has been the subject of much investigation. J.S. Hendricks published an early paper on them in 1928. Methylammonium chloride was investigated again in 1946 and methylammonium bromide in 1961.

== See also ==
- Onium compound
- Methylammonium lead halide
- Methylammonium nitrate
