= Methylammonium bromide =

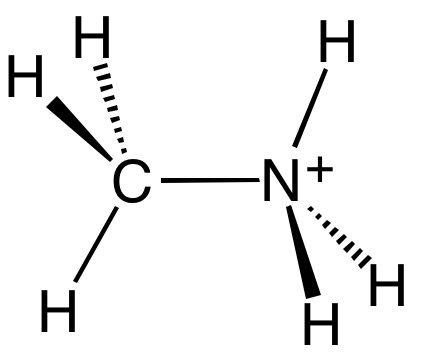
The methylammonium cation
The bromide anion
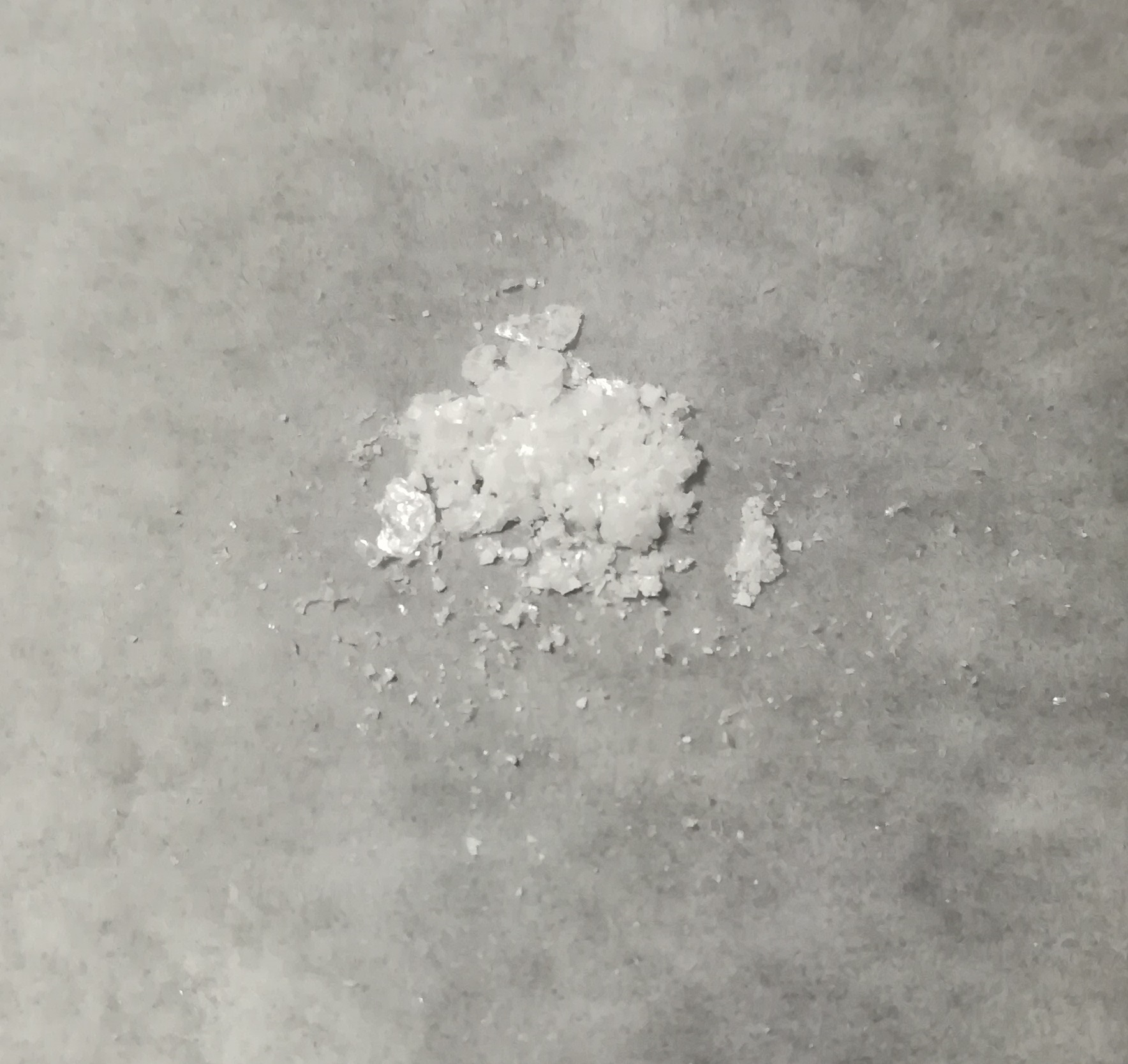
- Methylammonium bromide crystals

Names
- IUPAC name Methylazanium bromide
- Systematic IUPAC name Methanaminium bromide
- Other names: Methylamine hydrobromide

Identifiers
CAS Number	6876-37-5
3D model (JSmol)	Interactive image
ChemSpider	2282899
ECHA InfoCard	100.027.255
EC Number	229-981-5
PubChem CID	3014526
UNII	NDV5PY4944
CompTox Dashboard (EPA)	DTXSID80218868
- InChI: InChI=1S/CH5N.BrH/c1-2;/h2H2,1H3;1H Key: ISWNAMNOYHCTSB-UHFFFAOYSA-N
- SMILES: C[NH3+].[Br-]

Properties
Chemical formula	CH_{3}NH_{3}Br
Molar mass	111.96904 g/mol
Appearance	White crystals
Melting point	296 °C (565 °F; 569 K)

Hazards
- Occupational safety and health (OHS/OSH)
Main hazards	irritant
- Except where otherwise noted, data are given for materials in their standard state (at 25 °C [77 °F], 100 kPa). Infobox references

Methylammonium bromide in an organic halide with the formula of CH_{3}NH_{3}Br. It is the salt of methylammonium and bromide. It is a colorless, water-soluble solid.

The methylammonium halides are precursors to perovskite solar cells, which are being evaluated.

== Lead Detection ==
In 2019 research was conducted into determining if a solution containing Methylammonium Bromide (MABr) was effective at testing for the presence of lead. Researchers dumped lead bromide directly into a solution of MABr and observed fluorescence. CH_{3}NH_{3}PbBr_{3} exhibits fluorescence under illumination with 365nm light. The technique was found only generate fluorescence when lead ions were present. Yan et al. also painted a lead bromide solution onto a paper surface and observed fluorescence when MABr was subsequently added to the paper.

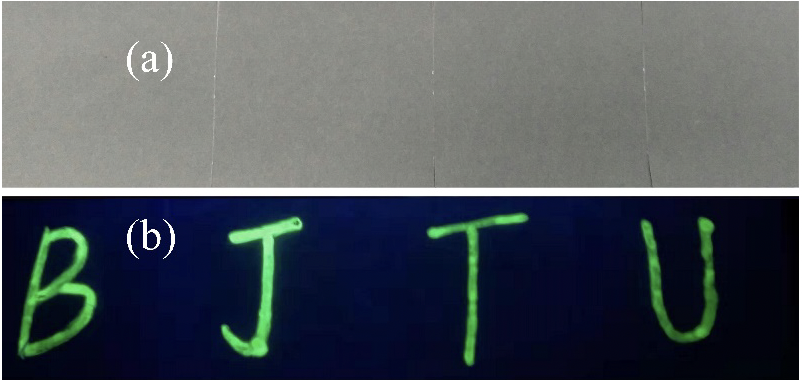
Figure S7 Digital images of the letters BJTU written with PbBr2 solution on a paper after MABr loading under (a) ambient light (b) a 365 nm UV lamp.
