= Lithium formate =

Identifiers
CAS Number	556-63-8; monohydrate: 6108-23-2
3D model (JSmol)	Interactive image; monohydrate: Interactive image
ChemSpider	61679; monohydrate: 11251293
ECHA InfoCard	100.008.304
EC Number	209-133-0; monohydrate: 676-657-8
PubChem CID	23680280; monohydrate: 23702287
UNII	5L7QBY030Z; monohydrate: ZQS5S890B6
CompTox Dashboard (EPA)	DTXSID0060303; monohydrate: DTXSID20635737
- InChI: InChI=1S/CH2O2.Li/c2-1-3;/h1H,(H,2,3);/q;+1/p-1 Key: XKPJKVVZOOEMPK-UHFFFAOYSA-M; monohydrate: InChI=1S/CH2O2.Li.H2O/c2-1-3;;/h1H,(H,2,3);;1H2/q;+1;/p-1 Key: RDAKCPVJSPEDON-UHFFFAOYSA-M
- SMILES: [Li+].C(=O)[O-]; monohydrate: [Li+].C(=O)[O-].O

Properties
Chemical formula	CHLiO_{2}
Molar mass	51.96 g·mol^{−1}

Hazards
- GHS labelling
Pictograms	(GHS07: Exclamation mark)
Signal word	Warning
Hazard statements	H315, H319, H335
Precautionary statements	P261, P264, P264+P265, P271, P280, P302+P352, P304+P340, P305+P351+P338, P319, P321, P332+P317, P337+P317, P362+P364, P403+P233, P405, P501

Related compounds
Other anions	Lithium acetate
Other cations	Sodium formate
- Except where otherwise noted, data are given for materials in their standard state (at 25 °C [77 °F], 100 kPa). Infobox references

Lithium formate (also called lithium methanoate) is an ionic chemical compound with the formula HCOOLi, and a molar mass of 51.95 g/mol. It is potentially nephrotoxic.

== Properties ==
Lithium formate crystalises in the orthorhombic crystal system, with space group Pna2_{1}. The unit cell has dimensions a = 6.99 Å, b = 6.50 Å and c = 4.85 Å.

The monohydrate loses water to form the anhydrous salt at 94 °C. Decomposition to lithium carbonate, carbon monoxide and hydrogen occurs at 230 °C.
