= Carbon trioxide =

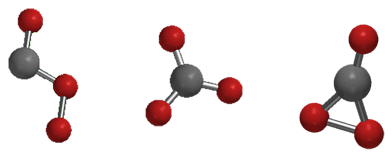
- The C_{s}, D_{3h}, and C_{2v} isomers of carbon trioxide

Names
- IUPAC names Carbon trioxide C_{2v} isomer: Dioxiran-3-one; D_{3h} isomer: Carbonate radical
- Systematic IUPAC name C_{2v} isomer: Peroxycarbonic anhydride; D_{3h} isomer: Trioxidocarbon(2•)
- Other names C_{s} isomer: Oxidooxymethanone; Peroxycarbonite radical

Identifiers
CAS Number	12144-05-7
3D model (JSmol)	C_{s}: Interactive image; D_{3h}: Interactive image; C_{2v}: Interactive image
PubChem CID	19817254
- InChI: InChI=1S/CO3/c2-1-3-4-1 Key: NPDDCAZCWJWIBW-UHFFFAOYSA-N
- SMILES: C_{s}: O=[C]O[O]; D_{3h}: O=C([O])[O]; C_{2v}: O=C1OO1

Properties
Chemical formula	CO_{3}
Molar mass	60.008 g·mol^{−1}
- Except where otherwise noted, data are given for materials in their standard state (at 25 °C [77 °F], 100 kPa). Infobox references

Carbon trioxide (CO_{3}) is an unstable oxide of carbon (an oxocarbon). The possible isomers of carbon trioxide include ones with molecular symmetry point groups C_{s}, D_{3h}, and C_{2v}. The C_{2v} state, consisting of a dioxirane, has been shown to be the ground state of the molecule. Carbon trioxide should not be confused with the stable carbonate ion (CO^{2−}_{3}).

Carbon trioxide can be produced, for example, in the drift zone of a negative corona discharge by reactions between carbon dioxide (CO_{2}) and the atomic oxygen (O) created from molecular oxygen by free electrons in the plasma. Another reported method is photolysis of ozone O_{3} dissolved in liquid CO_{2}, or in CO_{2}/SF_{6} mixtures at −45 °C (228 K; −49 °F), irradiated with light of 253.7 nm. The formation of CO_{3} is inferred but it appears to decay spontaneously by the route

2 CO_{3} → 2 CO_{2} + O_{2}

with a lifetime much shorter than 1 minute. Carbon trioxide can be made by blowing ozone at dry ice (solid CO_{2}), and it has also been detected in reactions between carbon monoxide (CO) and molecular oxygen (O_{2}). Along with the ground state C_{2v} isomer, the first spectroscopic detection of the D_{3h} isomer was in electron-irradiated ices of carbon dioxide.
