= Carbon tetroxide =

Names
- IUPAC name C_{2v} isomer: 1,2,3-Trioxetan-4-one; Oxygen carbonate; Monooxygen carbonate; D_{2d} isomer: Carbon diperoxide
- Other names C_{2v} isomer: 4-Trioxetanone; Trioxetan-4-one; D_{2d} isomer: 1,2,4,5-Tetraoxaspiro[2.2]pentane

Identifiers
CAS Number	853179-44-9
3D model (JSmol)	Interactive image
PubChem CID	22321311
CompTox Dashboard (EPA)	DTXSID901028836
- InChI: InChI=1S/CO4/c2-1-3-5-4-1 Key: ITOJEBDYSWRTML-UHFFFAOYSA-N
- SMILES: O=C1OOO1

Properties
Chemical formula	CO_{4}
Molar mass	76.007 g·mol^{−1}
- Except where otherwise noted, data are given for materials in their standard state (at 25 °C [77 °F], 100 kPa). Infobox references

Carbon tetroxide or Oxygen carbonate (in its C_{2v} isomer) is a highly unstable oxide of carbon with formula CO_{4}. It was proposed as an intermediate in the O-atom exchange between carbon dioxide (CO_{2}) and oxygen (O_{2}) at high temperatures. The C_{2v} isomer, which is 138 kJ mol^{−1} more stable than the D_{2d} isomer, was first detected in electron-irradiated ices of carbon dioxide via infrared spectroscopy.

The D_{2d} isomer of carbon tetroxide

The isovalent carbon tetrasulfide CS_{4} is also known from inert gas matrix. It has D_{2d} symmetry with the same atomic arrangement as CO_{4} (D_{2d}).
