= Methylamine =

Organic ammonia derivative

- Skeletal formula of methylamine with all explicit hydrogens added

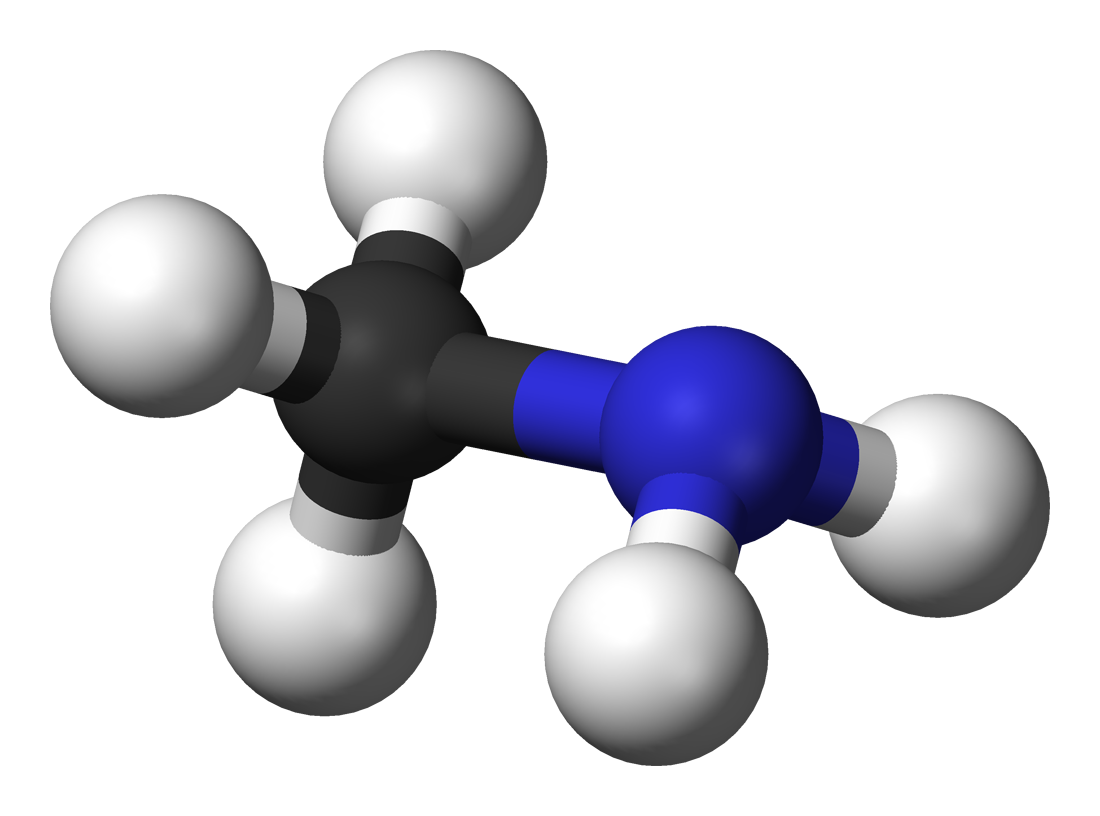
Ball and stick model of methylamine
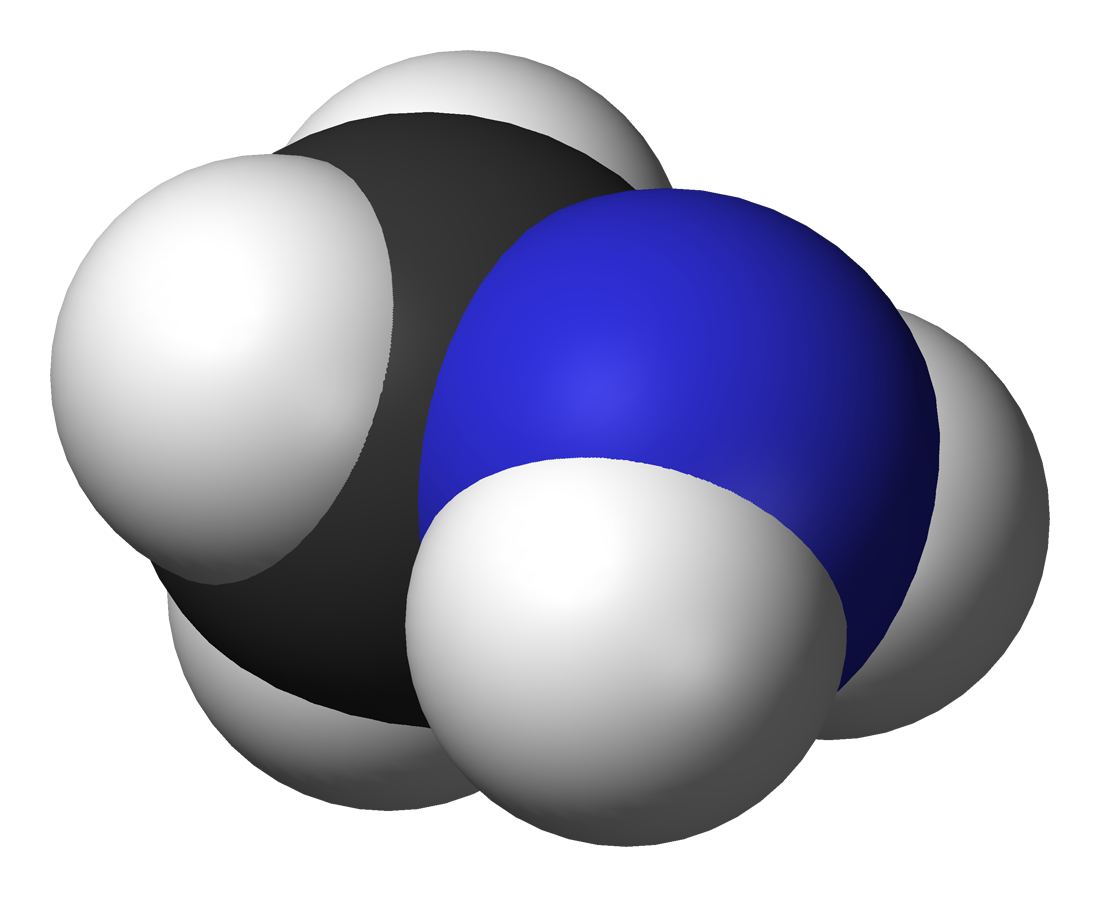
Spacefill model of methylamine

Names
Pronunciation	/ˌmɛθələˈmiːn/ (METH-ə-lə-MEEN), /ˌmɛθəˈlæmən/ (METH-ə-LA-mən), /məˈθɪləˌmiːn/ (mə-THIL-ə-meen)
- Preferred IUPAC name Methanamine
- Other names: Aminomethane; Monomethylamine

Identifiers
CAS Number	74-89-5
3D model (JSmol)	Interactive image
Abbreviations	MMA; MeNH_{2}
Beilstein Reference	741851
ChEBI	CHEBI:16830
ChEMBL	ChEMBL43280
ChemSpider	6089
DrugBank	DB01828
ECHA InfoCard	100.000.746
EC Number	200-820-0
Gmelin Reference	145
KEGG	C00218
MeSH	methylamine
PubChem CID	6329
RTECS number	PF6300000
UNII	BSF23SJ79E
UN number	1061
CompTox Dashboard (EPA)	DTXSID7025683
- InChI: InChI=1S/CH5N/c1-2/h2H2,1H3 Key: BAVYZALUXZFZLV-UHFFFAOYSA-N
- SMILES: CN

Properties
Chemical formula	CH_{5}N
Molar mass	31.058 g·mol^{−1}
Appearance	Colorless gas
Odor	Fishy, ammoniacal
Density	0.6562 g/cm^{3} (at 25 °C)
Melting point	−93.10 °C; −135.58 °F; 180.05 K
Boiling point	−6.6 to −6.0 °C; 20.0 to 21.1 °F; 266.5 to 267.1 K
Solubility in water	1008 g/L (at 20 °C)
log P	−0.472
Vapor pressure	186.10 kPa (at 20 °C)
Henry's law constant (k_{H})	1.4 mmol/(Pa·kg)
Acidity (pK_{a})	10.66
Conjugate acid	[CH_{3}NH_{3}]^{+} (Methylammonium)
Magnetic susceptibility (χ)	−27.0·10^{−6} cm^{3}/mol
Viscosity	230 μPa·s (at 0 °C)
Dipole moment	1.31 D

Thermochemistry
Std enthalpy of formation (Δ_{f}H^{⦵}_{298})	−23.5 kJ/mol

Hazards
- GHS labelling
Pictograms	(GHS02: Flammable) (GHS05: Corrosive) (GHS07: Exclamation mark)
Signal word	Danger
Hazard statements	H220, H315, H318, H332, H335
Precautionary statements	P210, P261, P280, P305+P351+P338, P410+P403
NFPA 704 (fire diamond)	3 4 0
Flash point	−10 °C; 14 °F; 263 K (liquid, gas is extremely flammable)
Autoignition temperature	430 °C (806 °F; 703 K)
Explosive limits	4.9–20.7%
- Lethal dose or concentration (LD, LC)
LD_{50} (median dose)	100 mg/kg (oral, rat)
LC_{50} (median concentration)	1860 ppm (mouse, 2 hr)
- NIOSH (US health exposure limits)
PEL (Permissible)	TWA 10 ppm (12 mg/m^{3})
REL (Recommended)	TWA 10 ppm (12 mg/m^{3})
IDLH (Immediate danger)	100 ppm
Safety data sheet (SDS)	emdchemicals.com

Related compounds
Related alkanamines	ethylamine, dimethylamine, trimethylamine
Related compounds	ammonia
- Except where otherwise noted, data are given for materials in their standard state (at 25 °C [77 °F], 100 kPa). verify (what is ?) Infobox references

Methylamine, also known as methanamine, is an organic compound with a formula of CH_{5}N or CH_{3}NH_{2}. This colorless gas is a derivative of ammonia, but with one hydrogen atom being replaced by a methyl group. It is the simplest primary amine.

Methylamine is sold dissolved in solution with methanol, ethanol, tetrahydrofuran, or water, or as the anhydrous gas in pressurized metal containers. Industrially, methylamine is transported in its anhydrous form in pressurized railcars and tank trailers. It has a strong odor similar to rotten fish. Methylamine is used as a building block for the synthesis of numerous other commercially available compounds.

== Production ==
=== Industrial production ===
Methylamine has been produced industrially since the 1920s (originally by Commercial Solvents Corporation for dehairing of animal skins). This was made possible by Kazimierz Smoleński and his wife Eugenia who discovered amination of alcohols, including methanol, on alumina or kaolin catalyst after WWI, filed two patent applications in 1919 and published an article in 1921.

It is now prepared commercially by the reaction of ammonia with methanol in the presence of an aluminosilicate catalyst. Dimethylamine and trimethylamine are co-produced; the reaction kinetics and reactant ratios determine the ratio of the three products. The product most favored by the reaction kinetics is trimethylamine.

CH_{3}OH + NH_{3} → CH_{3}NH_{2} + H_{2}O

In this way, an estimated 115,000 tons were produced in 2005.

=== Laboratory methods ===
Methylamine was first prepared in 1849 by Charles-Adolphe Wurtz via the hydrolysis of methyl isocyanate and related compounds. An example of this process includes the use of the Hofmann rearrangement, to yield methylamine from acetamide and bromine.

In the laboratory, methylamine hydrochloride is readily prepared by various other methods. One method entails treating formaldehyde with ammonium chloride.

[NH_{4}]Cl + CH_{2}O → [CH_{2}=NH_{2}]Cl + H_{2}O
[CH_{2}=NH_{2}]Cl + CH_{2}O + H_{2}O → [CH_{3}NH_{3}]Cl + HCOOH

The colorless hydrochloride salt can be converted to an amine by the addition of a strong base, such as sodium hydroxide (NaOH):

[CH_{3}NH_{3}]Cl + NaOH → CH_{3}NH_{2} + NaCl + H_{2}O

Another method entails reducing nitromethane with zinc and hydrochloric acid.

Another method of methylamine production is spontaneous decarboxylation of glycine with a strong base in water.

=== Biosynthesis ===
Methylamine arises as a result of putrefaction and is a substrate for methanogenesis.

Additionally, methylamine is produced during PADI4-dependent arginine demethylation.

== Reactivity and applications ==
Methylamine is a good nucleophile as it is an unhindered amine. As an amine it is considered a weak base. Its use in organic chemistry is pervasive. Some reactions involving simple reagents include: with phosgene to methyl isocyanate, with carbon disulfide and sodium hydroxide to the sodium methyldithiocarbamate, with chloroform and base to methyl isocyanide and with ethylene oxide to methylethanolamines. Liquid methylamine has solvent properties analogous to those of liquid ammonia.

Representative commercially significant chemicals produced from methylamine include the pharmaceuticals ephedrine and theophylline, the pesticides carbofuran, carbaryl, and metham sodium, and the solvents N-methylformamide and N-methylpyrrolidone. The preparation of some surfactants and photographic developers require methylamine as a building block.

== Safety ==
The LD_{50} (mouse, s.c.) is 2.5 g/kg.

The Occupational Safety and Health Administration (OSHA) and National Institute for Occupational Safety and Health (NIOSH) have set occupational exposure limits at 10 ppm or 12 mg/m^{3} over an eight-hour time-weighted average.

== Regulation ==
In the United States, methylamine is controlled as a List 1 precursor chemical by the Drug Enforcement Administration due to its use in the illicit production of methamphetamine.

== In popular culture ==
Fictional characters Walter White and Jesse Pinkman use aqueous methylamine as part of a process to synthesize methamphetamine in the AMC series Breaking Bad.

== See also ==
- Methylammonium halide
