= European Photovoltaic Solar Energy Conference and Exhibition =

Photovoltaics conference and exhibition

- Status: Active
- Genre: Conference, exhibition
- Frequency: Annual
- Location: Europe
- Years active: 43
- Founded: 1977; 49 years ago
- Most recent: EU PVSEC 2024
- Next event: EU PVSEC 2025
- Participants: 2000-4000
- Area: Photovoltaics
- Organizer: WIP Renewable Energies
- People: Diana Ürge-Vorsatz; Martin Green
- Member: European Commission
- Website: eupvsec.org

The European Photovoltaic Solar Energy Conference and Exhibition (EU PVSEC) is an international scientific conference and industry exhibition in the solar energy industry. The event covers developments in different aspects of photovoltaics, including science, technology, systems, finance, policies, and markets. The conference topics include the spectrum of photovoltaics value chain, such as policy considerations and foundational aspects.

EU PVSEC is one of the three hosts of the quadrennial World Conference on Photovoltaic Energy Conversion (WCPEC), along with the IEEE's PVSC on the USA side and PVSEC on the Asia-Pacific side.

== History ==
The record of the past EU PVSEC events is as follows:

Year	Location	Chairperson	Notes
1977	Luxembourg City, Luxembourg	Albert Strub	
1979	Berlin, Germany	Roger van Overstraeten	
1980	Cannes, France	Wolfgang Palz	
1982	Stresa, Italy	Werner H. Bloss	
1983	Athens, Greece	Fabio Fittipaldi	
1985	London, United Kingdom	Fred Treble	
1986	Seville, Spain	Adolf Goetzerberger	
1988	Florence, Italy	Ionel Solomon	
1989	Freiburg, Germany	Gerry Wrixon	
1991	Lisbon, Portugal	Antonio Luque	
1992	Montreux, Switzerland	Leopoldo Guimaraes	
1994	Amsterdam, Netherlands	Robert Hill	
1995	Nice, France	Werner Freiesleben	
1998	Vienna, Austria	Juergen Schmid	WCPEC-2
2000	Glasgow, United Kingdom	Hermann Scheer	
2001	Munich, Germany	Bernard McNelis	
2004	Paris, France	Winfried Hoffman	
2005	Barcelona, Spain	Heinz Ossenbrink	
2006	Dresden, Germany	Jef Poortmans	
2007	Milan, Italy	Gerhard Willeke	
2008	Valencia, Spain	Daniel Lincot	
2009	Hamburg, Germany	Wim Sinke	
2010	Valencia, Spain	Giovanni De Santi	WCPEC-5
2011	Hamburg, Germany	Heinz Ossenbrink	
2012	Frankfurt, Germany	Stefan Novak	
2013	Paris, France	Arnaud Mine	
2014	Amsterdam, Netherlands	Teun Bokhoven	
2014	Durban, South Africa		Africa PVSEC
2015	Hamburg, Germany	Stefan Rinck	
2016	Munich, Germany	Marko Topic	
2017	Amsterdam, Netherlands	Arno H.M. Smets	
2018	Brussels, Belgium	Pierre Verlinden	
2019	Marseille, France	Florence Lambert	
2020	Online	Nicola Pearsall	
2021	Online	João Serra	
2022	Milan, Italy	Alessandra Scognamiglio	WCPEC-8
2023	Lisbon, Portugal	João Serra	
2024	Vienna, Austria	Gabriele C. Eder	
2025	Bilbao, Spain	Carlos del Cañizo	
2026	Rotterdam, Netherlands	Wilfried van Sark	
2027	Freiburg, Germany		upcoming

== Conference Topics ==
The technical programme of the conference is coordinated by the European Commission's Joint Research Centre (JRC) and is structured on the following 5 topics:

- Silicon Materials and Cells
- Thin-Films and New Concepts
- Photovoltaic Modules
- Photovoltaic Systems
- Photovoltaics in the Energy Transition

== Prizes and Awards ==
The list of the prizes and awards that are delivered during the EU PVSEC:

- Becquerel Prize
- Student Awards
- Poster Awards

=== Becquerel Prize ===
The Alexandre Edmond Becquerel Prize is granted by the European Commission as a highlight of the Opening Ceremony of the EU PVSEC, in the purpose of honouring outstanding and major contributions in photovoltaic solar electricity. The prize is named after Edmond Becquerel, French physicist who created the world's first photovoltaic cell. It has been awarded since 1989.

Notable recipients of the prize over the years include Roger Van Overstraeten (1989), Werner H. Bloss (1991), Antonio Luque (1992), Adolf Goetzberger (1997), Joachim Luther (2005), Arvind Victor Shah (2007), Mechtild Rothe (2008), Andres Cuevas (2015), Henry Snaith (2020), and Daniel Lincot (2024), among others.

== See also ==
- Solar power in the European Union
- European Commission
- WCPEC
- PVSC
