= Becquerel Prize =

Annual European Commission prize for advancements in solar power

European Becquerel Prize
- Description: Award honoring scientific, technical, or managerial merits in photovoltaic solar energy
- Country: European Union / International
- Presented by: European Commission

The European Becquerel Prize for Outstanding Merits in Photovoltaics (or in short the Becquerel Prize) is a prize to honour scientific, technical or managerial merits in the field of photovoltaic solar energy. It has been established in 1989 by the European Commission at the occasion of the 150th anniversary of a groundbreaking experiment by Alexandre-Edmond Becquerel, also known as Edmond Becquerel, in which he discovered the photovoltaic effect. The prize is awarded to a single individual who is recognized for continuous achievements in the field of photovoltaic energy conversion.

== History and background ==
The prize is primarily a European award but not restricted exclusively to European citizens. The prize is granted by the European Commission. The Becquerel Prize Committee selects the individual to be honoured.

The prize is awarded periodically at the annual European Photovoltaic Solar Energy Conference (EU PVSEC).

== Prize winners ==
The Becquerel Prize Committee lists the following winners:

- 1989 Roger Van Overstraeten
- 1991 Werner H. Bloss
- 1992 Antonio Luque Lopez
- 1994 Morton Prince
- 1995 Karlheinz Krebs
- 1997 Adolf Goetzberger
- 1998 Walter Sandtner
- 2000 Frederick C. Treble
- 2001 Viacheslav Andreev
- 2003 Wolfgang Palz
- 2004 Masafumi Yamaguchi
- 2005 Joachim Luther
- 2006 Dieter Bonnet, Richard M. Swanson
- 2007 Arvind Victor Shah
- 2008 Mechtild Rothe, politician
- 2009 Andreas W. Bett
- 2010 Hans-Werner Schock
- 2011 Wim Sinke
- 2012 Winfried Hoffmann
- 2013 Gabriel Sala
- 2014 Stefan Glunz
- 2015 Andrés Cuevas
- 2016 Christophe Ballif
- 2017 Stefan Nowak
- 2018 Peter Wuerfel
- 2019 Pierre J. Verlinden
- 2020 Henry Snaith
- 2021 Ulrike Jahn
- 2022 Marko Topic
- 2023 Gunter Erfurt
- 2024 Daniel Lincot
- 2025 Walburga Hemetsberger

== See also ==
- List of physics awards
