= Talalay =

Talalay is a surname. Notable people with the surname include:

- Denis Talalay (born 1992), Russian footballer
- Paul Talalay (1923–2019), American pharmacologist
- Pavel Talalay (born 1962), Russian drilling engineer
- Rachel Talalay (born 1958), British-American film and television director and producer

== See also ==
- Talalay process
