= Pierre J. Verlinden =

Australian photovoltaic scientist and engineer

- Born: Pierre J. Verlinden
- Education: Catholic University of Louvain; Stanford University
- Awards: William R. Cherry Award (2016); Friendship Award China (2017); Becquerel Prize (2019); IEEE Fellow (2023)
- Scientific career
- Fields: Photovoltaics, Electrical engineering

Pierre J. Verlinden (born 14 January 1957) is a Belgian-Australian photovoltaic scientist and engineer. He has worked in the field of photovoltaics for over four decades, holding senior research and leadership positions in both industry and academia. As of 2022, he serves as Chief Scientist at the Yangtze Institute for Solar Technology (YIST) in Jiangyin, China.

== Education ==
Verlinden received his Master’s degree (1979) and Ph.D. (1985) in Electrical Engineering from the Université catholique de Louvain in Belgium. In 1987, he was a NATO Research Fellow and Visiting Scholar at Stanford University.

== Career ==
Verlinden has held a range of academic and industrial roles focused on photovoltaic (PV) technology. He was a founder and Managing Director of AMROCK, a PV technology consulting firm in Australia. He also held adjunct professorships at Sun Yat-sen University in Guangzhou, China (2014–2019), and the University of New South Wales (UNSW) in Sydney, Australia (2020–2023).

From 2012 to 2018, Verlinden was Chief Scientist, Vice-President, and Vice-Chair of the State Key Laboratory of Photovoltaic Science and Technology at Trina Solar. He continued as part-time Chief Scientist at Trina Solar from 2018 to 2025. He previously held senior roles including Director of R&D at SunPower Corporation (1991–2001), Manager of PV Technology and Operations at Origin Energy (2002–2005), and Principal Scientist at Solar Systems (2005–2009).

== Research and Publications ==
Verlinden has authored or co-authored more than 200 technical papers and contributed to several books on solar energy. He holds 36 patents, primarily in the field of photovoltaic device technology. His research has contributed to advancements in:

- High-efficiency silicon solar cells
- Interdigitated back contact (IBC) solar cells
- PERC and TOPCon solar cell architectures
- Perovskite-silicon tandem solar cells
- Multijunction III-V concentrator photovoltaic (CPV) systems

== Awards and recognition ==
- William R. Cherry Award (2016), presented by the IEEE.
- Chinese Government Friendship Award (2017), the highest award given by the Chinese government to foreign experts.
- Becquerel Prize (2019), awarded by the European Commission.
- Doctor Honoris Causa from the University of New South Wales (2023).
- Francqui Chair at Hasselt University (2023).
- Named a Senior Member of the Institute of Electrical and Electronics Engineers (IEEE) in 2013 and elevated to Fellow Member in 2023.
