= Ravi Prakash Singh =

Indian scientist and wheat geneticist

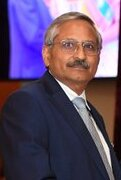
- Dr. Ravi Prakash Singh receiving the Padma Shri award in 2024
- Born: Varanasi, India
- Education: Banaras Hindu University, University of Sydney
- Known for: Wheat genetics and rust resistance research
- Awards: Padma Shri (2024); Pravasi Bharatiya Samman (2021); China's Friendship Award
- Scientific career
- Fields: Agricultural science, Genetics, Plant breeding
- Workplaces: International Maize and Wheat Improvement Center

Ravi Prakash Singh is an Indian agricultural scientist and wheat geneticist known for his contributions to crop improvement and global food security. He served at the International Maize and Wheat Improvement Center (CIMMYT) for nearly four decades and led significant research on developing disease-resistant and climate-resilient wheat varieties.

== Early life and education ==
Singh was born in Varanasi, India. He earned his bachelor's and master's degrees in agriculture from Banaras Hindu University in 1977 and 1979, respectively. He obtained a Ph.D. in plant breeding and genetics from the University of Sydney in 1983.

== Career ==
In 1983, Singh joined CIMMYT, headquartered in Mexico, where he worked until his retirement in 2022. He played a pivotal role in wheat improvement research and was instrumental in combating wheat rust diseases globally.

== Awards and recognition ==
Singh has received numerous international recognitions:

- In 2021, he was conferred the Pravasi Bharatiya Samman, India's highest honour for overseas Indians.
- In recognition of his contributions to China's agricultural development, he received the Friendship Award from the Government of China.
- In 2024, the Government of India awarded him the Padma Shri, the nation's fourth-highest civilian award, for his contribution to science and engineering.

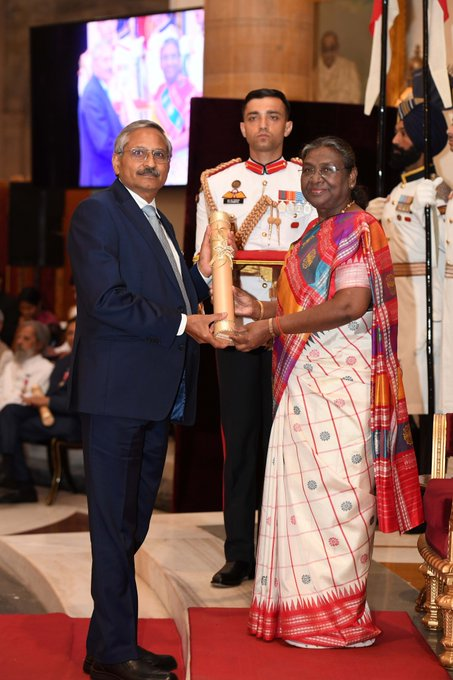
Dr. Ravi Prakash Singh receiving the Padma Shri from President Droupadi Murmu, 2024

== See also ==
- List of Padma Shri award recipients (2020–2029)
