= Joachim Luther =

German scientist (born 1941)

Professor Joachim Luther
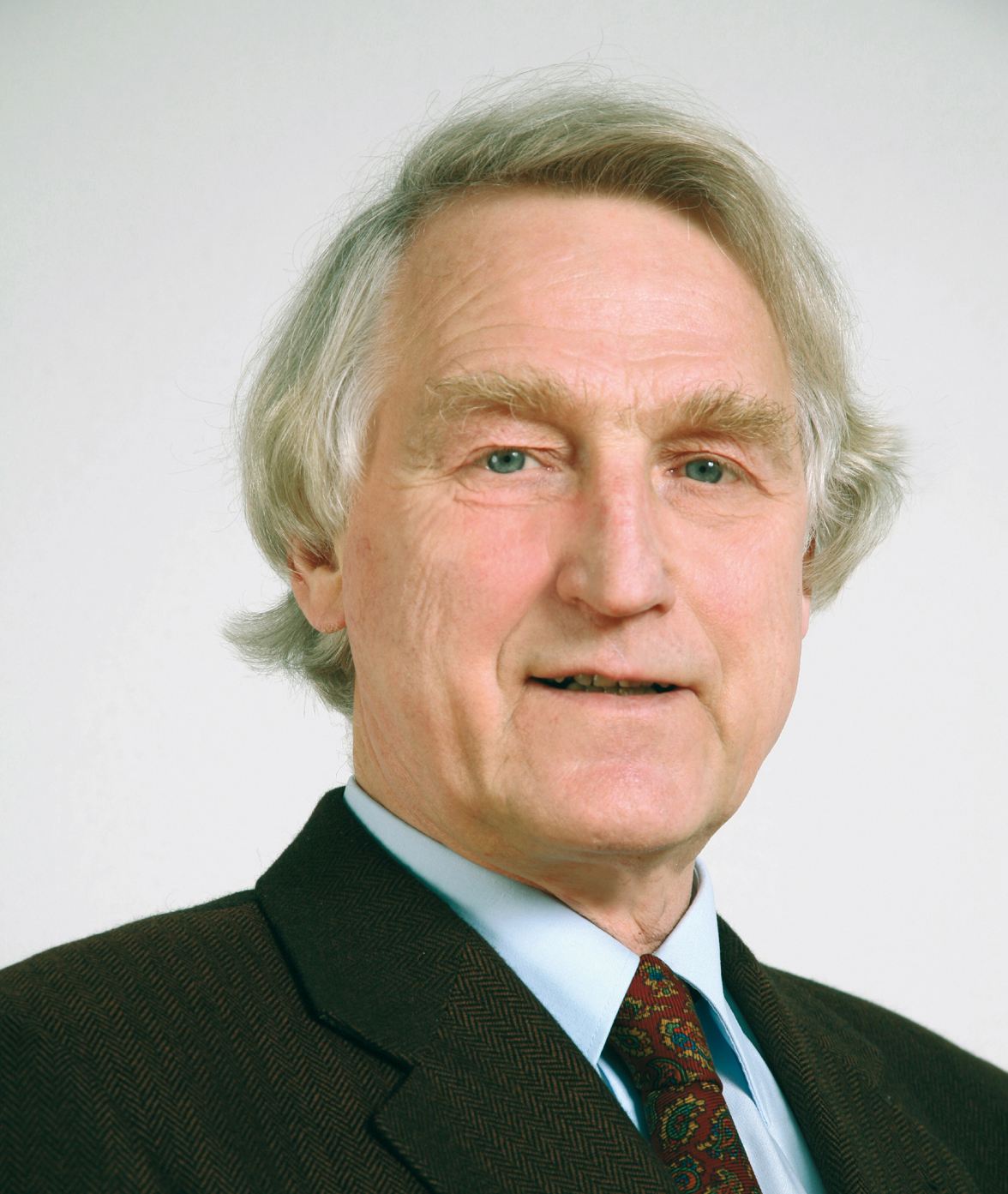
- Born: 31 March 1941 (age 85); Hannover
- Education: Leibniz University Hannover
- Known for: Research on solar energy, development of high-efficiency solar cells
- Awards: Becquerel Prize (2005), Environment Prize of the German Environment Foundation (2005), Time magazine's Heroes of the Environment (2008)
- Scientific career
- Fields: Experimental Physics; Renewable Energy; Solar Energy
- Workplaces: University of Oldenburg; University of Freiburg; Fraunhofer ISE; SERIS
- Thesis: Hanle-Effekt-Messungen an Zuständen gerader und ungerader Parität im Yb I-Spektrum (1970)

Joachim Luther (born 31 March 1941 in Hannover, Germany) received his PhD in experimental physics at the Leibniz University Hannover in 1970.

== Academic career ==
In 1974, Luther became professor of physics at the newly founded University of Oldenburg. In the beginning of the 1980s, his scientific interest shifted towards renewable energy sources, in particular solar power. In 1987, he became dean of the physics faculty at this university.

In 1993, he accepted a call to become professor of solid-state physics at the University of Freiburg in Southern Germany and head of the Fraunhofer Institute for Solar Energy Systems ISE in this city at the same time. He succeeded Adolf Goetzberger in these functions. In the following years, Luther established this institute as the largest research center for solar energy in Europe. During his tenure, various solar cells with world-record characteristics at the time were developed at ISE:

- Polycrystalline silicon solar cells with 20.3% conversion efficiency
- monocrystalline III-V heterojunction compound semiconductor solar cell with 35% conversion efficiency for concentrator applications
- monocrystalline silicon solar cell flexible wafer with only 37 micrometer thickness and 20.2% conversion efficiency.

Luther retired from ISE in 2006. In 2008, he was asked by the Government of Singapore to set-up and head the newly founded Solar Energy Research Institute of Singapore (SERIS). In 2012, he returned to Germany, where he is director emeritus of ISE.

== Memberships ==
List provided by the German Environment Foundation.

- Board member of the International Solar Energy Society (ISES) from 1992 to 2001
- President of the EUREC Agency (the European Association of Renewable Energy Research Centers) from 1997 to 2002
- Member, then Chairman of the Scientific Council of the Fraunhofer Society from 1995 to 2006, as well as member of its Senate from 2001 to 2006
- Member of the Scientific Council of the Hahn-Meitner Institute, Berlin, from 1997 to 2004
- Member of the Scientific Advisory Board of the Federal Government Global Environmental Change (WBGU), Germany, from 2000 to 2004
- Vice-Chairman of the European Union Photovoltaic Technology Platform from 2005 to 2009
- Member of the Commission of Experts for Research and Innovation, appointed by the Federal Government of Germany, from 2007 to 2010
- Chairman of the International Science Panel on Renewable Energies (ISPRE) from 2007 to 2010
- Chairman of the Prize Committee of the Becquerel Prize organisation since 2010

He was Editor-in-Chief of the Solar Energy published by Elsevier from 1999 to 2002.

== Awards and honors ==
- 2005 Becquerel Prize for outstanding merits in photovoltaics
- 2005 Environment Prize of the German Environment Foundation
- 2005 Special Service Award of the International Society for Solar Energy
- 2005 International Rhineland Prize for Environmental Protection
- 2006 Fraunhofer Mint for his outstanding services to the Fraunhofer Society
- 2008 Luther was named one of the Heroes of the Environment (2008) by the Time magazine
- 2009 Achievement through Action Award of the International Solar Energy Society (ISES)
