= Isofoton =

Spanish photovoltaic technology company

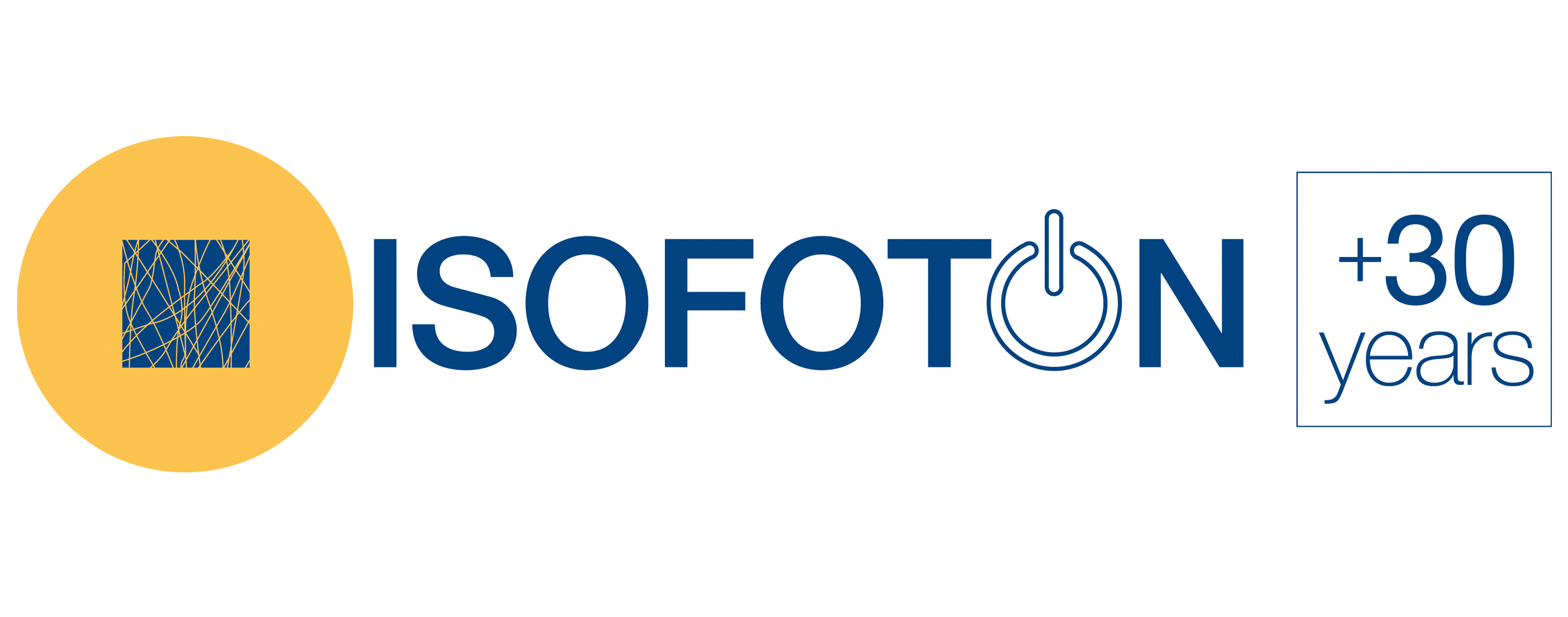
- Type: Privately held company
- Industry: Photovoltaic, Solar Energy
- Founded: 1981; Málaga, Spain
- Founder: Antonio Luque
- Defunct: 2015
- Fate: Bankrupted after 34 yrs. of operation
- Headquarters: Málaga, Spain, Madrid, Spain
- Area served: International
- Number of employees: 1142 (2007)
- Parent: Bergé Group (1997-2010) Affirma Group (2010-2015)
- Website: www.isofoton.com

Founded in 1981 Isofoton was a Spanish leading manufacturer of photovoltaic cells and modules that had its HQ in Málaga and a distribution network present in over 60 countries. It started as a spin-off of the pioneering research programme of the Institute of Solar Energy of the Technical University of Madrid (IES-UPM) in the field of silicon bifacial solar cells, today a mainstream solar cell technology. In fact, it was the very first factory in the world to mass-produce, market and install this type of solar cell technology. By 1987 it abandoned manufacturing of bifacials and transitioned to conventional monofacial solar cells, still, it forged ahead successfully and from 2000 to 2005 it ranked among the top 10 PV manufacturers in the world. At its peak, by 2007, Isofoton employed 1142 people, produced 103MW and had an annual turnover of 414 million euros. In 2014 it filed for bankruptcy, as happened with almost all of the European and US PV manufacturers operating at the time, mainly due to the price pressure of a new wave of Chinese manufacturers.

== History ==
Isofoton was founded in 1981 as a spin-off of a university research project on the development of bifacial solar cells led by Professor Antonio Luque, director of the Institute of Solar Energy of the Technical University of Madrid. This research project had started around 1975 and had investigated, patented and produced different bifacial solar cell architectures. The best performing of these, an npp^{+} structure, was selected for industrial production in Isofoton, to commercially exploit their enhanced power production when suitably installed with high albedo surfaces behind, whether ground or walls. it was named Isofoton because its cells singularly used all isotropic photons and was established in Málaga, Luque's hometown. Its initial capital came from family and friends (e.g. most of the employees and research staff of the Institute of Solar Energy) plus some money from Technical University of Madrid, that was used to buy equipment, and public capital from an industrial development fund, Sodean (Sociedad para el Desarrollo Energético de Andalucía) from the regional government of Andalusia. It set sail with 45 private shareholders, Luque acting as 1st chairman and also co-CEO, together with his brother Alberto, a seasoned industrial entrepreneur, and having his former doctoral student, Javier Eguren, as CTO. Eguren and Gabriel Sala led the technology transfer from the Institute of Solar Energy to Isofoton.

By 1983 Isofoton's factory in Málaga had a manufacturing capacity of 330 kW/yr. of bifacial modules (with a 15 people net headcount) at a time when the global market of photovoltaics was in the range of 15 MW. In 1985, Abengoa and BBVA enter as new shareholders of Isofoton, with Luque remaining as chairman but appointing Abengoa's Francisco Llorente as CEO. At that time, the market of terrestrial photovoltaic power plants, to which Isofoton oriented its production, essentially consisted of demonstration projects. Thus, early landmarks of Isofoton's bifacial solar cell production were the 20kWp power plant in San Agustín de Guadalix, built in 1986 for Iberdrola, and an off-grid installation completed by 1988 also of 20kWp in the village of Noto Gouye Diama (Senegal) funded by the Spanish international aid and cooperation programs. In 1987 Alcatel-Standard Eléctrica, the Spanish subsidiary of the French group Alcatel after having acquired the Spanish manufacturer of telephone equipment Standard Eléctrica, joins as controlling shareholder. Upon Alcatel's entry the decision was taken to switch production to more conventional monofacial photovoltaic cells, based on licensed technology from US PV manufacturer Arco Solar. Alcatel's Jesús Martinez Atienza is appointed CEO. In 1991 Luque is replaced as chairman by Valeriano Ruiz and José Luis Manzano becomes the new CEO.

In 1997 the Bergé Group, a Spanish leading automotive distributor, buys Isofotón and Rafael Sainz becomes its new chairman with Manzano remaining as CEO. It forged ahead successfully and from 2000 to 2005 Isofoton ranked among the world's top 10 photovoltaic manufacturers. Propelled by the German and Spanish feed in tariff markets and complemented by its traditional commitment to rural electrification projects mostly in the Third World, by 2007 Isofoton employed 1142 people, produced 103MW and registered an annual turnover of 414 million euros. In July 2007 the Alba Corporation, property of the March Group, bought 26%, of the company with the intention of issuing an IPO. In February 2008, Carlos Torres Vila replaced Jose Luis Manzano as CEO. However, the IPO was finally not launched and in July of the same year, the Bergé Group bought back Alba's 26%.

In July 2010 Isofoton was acquired by the Spanish Affirma Group (80% ownership) and Toptec (20% ownership), a South Korean company specialized in industrial automation. Affirma's owner, Angel Luis Serrano became its new chairman. Isofoton began to struggle mostly due to the price pressure being set by the new wave of Chinese PV manufacturers that had come of age. This was happening to most European, US and Japanese PV manufacturers that would gradually file for bankruptcy or leave the business in the course of this decade; by 2019 there was only one non-Chinese company among the top 10. In 2013 the company was investigated for inappropriate spending of recent public subsidies and approached bankruptcy, finally closing down its facilities in January 2014.

== Factory ==
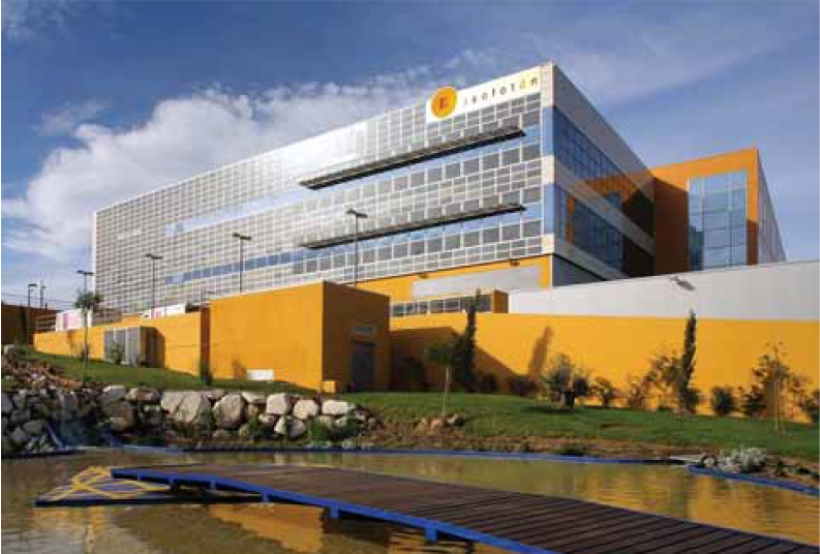
Isofoton's factory at the Andalusia Technology Park in Málaga, built in 2006.

Isofoton started its manufacturing in an industrial warehouse at the Industrial State Santa Teresa, property of Antonio Luque's family, in the outskirts of Málaga. There it would gradually scale its manufacturing capacity up to 50MW/yr distributed over a total 4120m^{2} surface. In 2006, at the cusp of its progress, it moved its facilities to a newly built factory building at the Andalusia Technology Park, also in Málaga, that was inaugurated by King Juan Carlos I. This one had more than 28000m^{2} and was planned for a maximum capacity of 200MW/yr. It contained 84kW of building integrated photovoltaics, most of it in glass-glass PV glazings covering its outer walls.

== Research and development ==
Isofoton worked in collaboration with universities and research centers in Spain and around the world. Many research projects held by Isofoton had an international dimension. For example, the European Commission's CORDIS database, holds records of 31 European collaborative R&D projects, carried out in between 1987 and 2009, that counted with Isofoton in their consortia. Research topics of these cover the manufacturing of Si-based PV modules and the related equipment and processes, the production of solar-grade silicon, the development of building-integrated PV products, high concentration photovoltaics, third generation photovoltaic devices, or a wide range of demonstration PV installations both on and off grid.

== Bankruptcy ==
In 2015, the company went bankrupt and its remaining assets, which were valued at 57 million, were auctioned to cover a debt of 160 million.
