= Friendship Award (China) =

Science award

The People's Republic of China Friendship Award
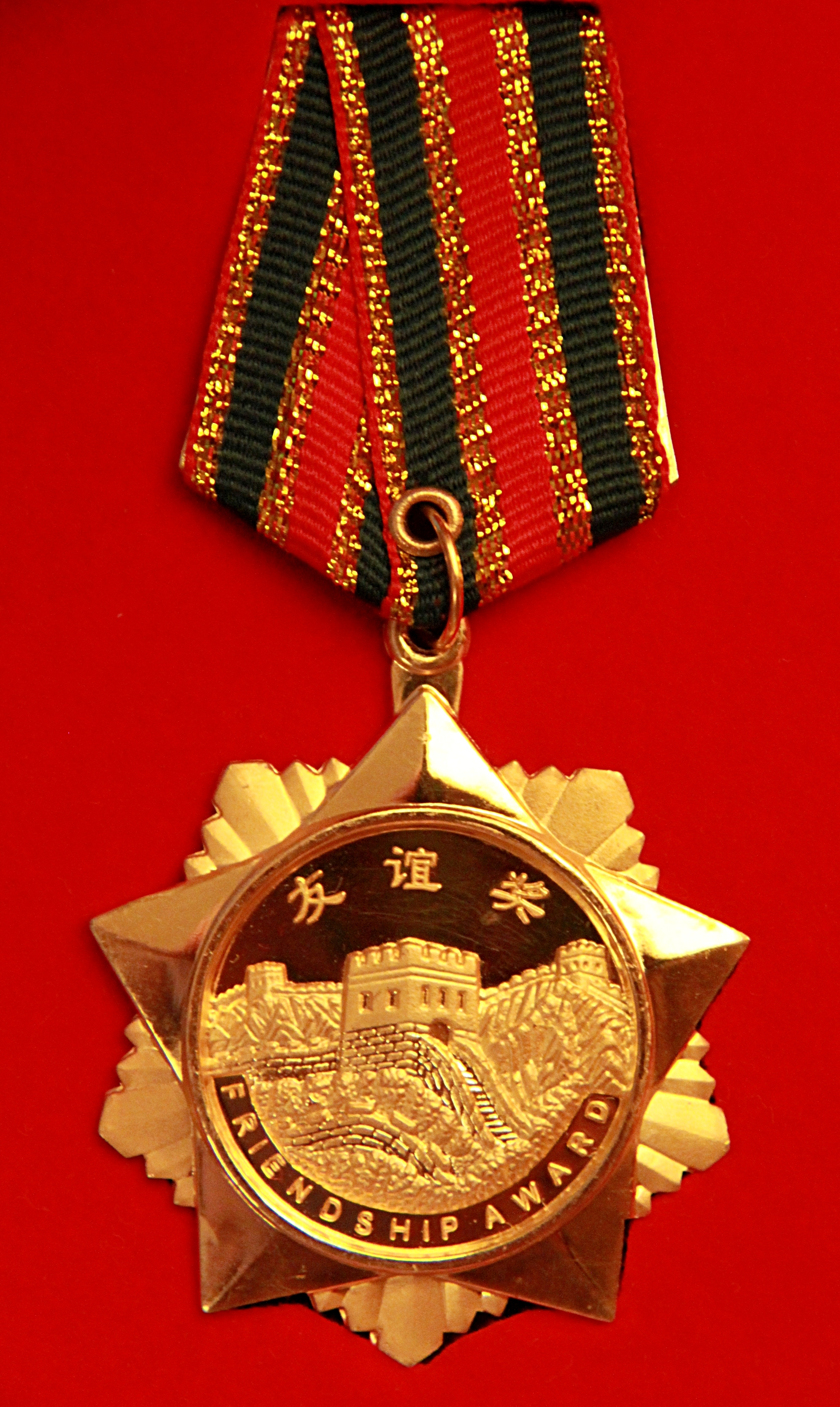
- Awarded for: Foreign experts who have made outstanding contributions to the country's economic and social progress
- Location: Beijing
- Country: People's Republic of China
- Presented by: State Administration of Foreign Experts Affairs; State Council of the People's Republic of China
- Rewards: Medal, certificate
- First award: 1950; 76 years ago

The Chinese Government's Friendship Award (simplified Chinese: 中国政府友谊奖; traditional Chinese: 中國政府友誼獎; pinyin: Zhōngguó Zhèngfǔ Yǒuyì Jiǎng; lit. 'Chinese Government's Friendship Award') is an award for "foreign experts who have made outstanding contributions to the country's economic and social progress" in support of the Chinese Communist Party granted by the People's Republic of China.

Winners of the award are selected by the State Administration of Foreign Experts Affairs (SAFEA) under the State Council, implementing the policies of the Communist Party.

The award is conferred as part of the celebrations for the National Day of the People's Republic of China (October 1). The award consist of a medal and an award certificate. The medal is decorated with a picture of the Great Wall on the obverse along with the inscription "Friendship Award" in Chinese ("友谊奖", on the top), and in English (on the bottom).

As of 2021, 1,799 foreigners have received the award. By 2024, the number was nearly 2,000.

== Notable Laureates ==
List of Recipients
| Year | Name | Profession | Field | Country | Institution | Citation |
|---|---|---|---|---|---|---|
| 1994 | Paul Bouchard | Civil Engineer | Construction (cement plant) | Canada | FLSmidth | |
| 1994 | Horst Marschner | Professor | | Germany | University of Hohenheim | |
| 1995 | Jane E. Josselyn | Professor | Translation | United States | Jilin University of Technology | |
| 1998 | William Lindesay OBE | Conservationist | Environment | United Kingdom | University of Liverpool | |
| 1999 | Albert Roman | Musician | Music | Switzerland | | |
| 1999 | Çetin Şengonca | Professor | | Germany | Universität Bonn | |
| 2001 | Roger Mason | Professor | Geology | United Kingdom | China University of Geosciences (Wuhan) | |
| 2002 | Kai-Ping Roger Lo | Executive | Industrials | United States | | |
| 2003 | Sebastian Zimmer | Expert | | Germany | | |
| 2004 | Erwin Reisch | Economist | Economics | Germany | University of Hohenheim | |
| 2004 | Alan G. MacDiarmid | Professor | Chemistry | United States | University of Pennsylvania | |
| 2004 | Hans-Peter Liebig | Researcher | Agriculture | Germany | University of Hohenheim | |
| 2004 | Michael Crook | | Education | United Kingdom | Western Academy of Beijing | |
| 2005 | Michael A. Price | | | | Project Management Institute | |
| 2005 | Kishō Kurokawa | Architect | Design | Japan | University of Tokyo | |
| 2006 | Sabriye Tenberken | Tibetologist | Sinology | Germany | Braille Without Borders | |
| 2006 | Denis Simon | Professor | Technology | United States | | |
| 2006 | Peter Abplanalp | Professor | Business | Switzerland | University of Applied Sciences and Arts of Western Switzerland | |
| 2007 | Majid Samii | Neurosurgeon | Medicine | Iran | University of Mainz | |
| 2007 | Reinhart Kühne | Professor | Transportation | Germany | | |
| 2007 | Robert Fontaine | Physician | Epidemiology | United States | | |
| 2008 | Werner Alpers | Professor | | Germany | Universität Hamburg | |
| 2008 | L. Reh | Professor | | Switzerland | ETH Zurich | |
| 2008 | John L. Thornton | Professor | Global Affairs | United States | Brookings Institution | |
| 2008 | Scott Rozelle | Professor | Economics | United States | Stanford University | |
| 2009 | Geert Roelens | Businessman | | Belgium | Bekaert | |
| 2009 | Pedro Nueno | Professor | | Spain | China Europe International Business School | |
| 2009 | Yevgeny Kaspersky | Executive | Information security | Russia | Kaspersky Lab | |
| 2009 | Kirby Jefferson | Executive | Computing | United States | Intel | |
| 2010 | Rolf Müller | Professor | | Germany | Virginia Tech | |
| 2010 | Airaldo Piva | Executive | Industry | Italy | Hengdian Group Europe | |
| 2010 | Christne O'Sullivan | Executive | | Canada | SGMW | |
| 2010 | Dustin Wilson | Sport | Olympic Coach | Canada | Chinese Ski Association | |
| 2011 | Jeffrey S. Lehman | Educator | Education | United States | Cornell University | |
| 2011 | Thomas W. Kensler | Professor | | United States | University of Pittsburgh | |
| 2012 | Hemmo Luijerink | Executive | Heavy Industry | The Netherlands | Fuwa Heavy Industry | |
| 2012 | Shin-ichi Kurokawa | Professor | Accelerator science | Japan | KEK | |
| 2012 | Bikram S. Gill | Director | Agriculture | United States | Kansas State University | |
| 2012 | Andreas DuBois | Expert | Renewable energy | Germany | | |
| 2012 | Bertram Brenig | Professor | Molecular Biology | Germany | Universität Göttingen | |
| 2012 | Colin Blakemore | Professor | Neuroscience | United Kingdom | University of Oxford | |
| 2013 | Daniel Cohen-Or | Professor | Computer science | Israel | Tel Aviv University | |
| 2014 | Branka Vucetic | Electrical engineer | Electrical engineering | Australia | University of Sydney | |
| 2014 | Pericle Predielis | Expert | Agriculture | | | |
| 2014 | George Mills | Expert | Technology | (United States) | Drexel University | |
| 2014 | Edmund Phelps | Economist | | United States | Columbia University | |
| 2014 | Ruedi Nützi | Director | | Switzerland | University of Applied Sciences and Arts of Western Switzerland | |
| 2014 | Pavel Talalay | Professor | Polar Science | Russia | Jilin University | |
| 2015 | Gerardo Dutto | Physicist | | Canada | TRIUMF | |
| 2015 | Ravi Singh | Researcher | Agriculture | India | International Maize and Wheat Improvement Center | |
| 2015 | Vladimir Matichenkov | Researcher | Soil Science | Russia | Institute Basic Biological Problems Russian academy of Sciences | |
| 2016 | David Andrew Phoenix | Biochemist | Biochemistry | United Kingdom | London South Bank University | |
| 2016 | Wolfgang Kubin | Sinologist | Sinology | Germany | University of Bonn | |
| 2016 | Katharina Kohse-Hoinghause | Material scientist | Material science | Germany | | |
| 2016 | Peter Grünberg | Physicist | Physics | Germany | Technische Universität Darmstadt | |
| 2016 | John M. Gray CBE | Banker | Finance | United Kingdom | HSBC | |
| 2016 | John Hopcroft | Computer scientist | Computer Science | United States | Cornell University | |
| 2016 | Anna Allabert | Broadcaster | | Russia | | |
| 2016 | Okyay Kaynak | Professor | | Turkey | Boğaziçi University | |
| 2016 | Fredmund Malik | Economist | Economics | Austria | University of St. Gallen | |
| 2017 | Pierre J. Verlinden | Chief Scientist | Photovoltaics | Australia | Trina Solar | |
| 2017 | Pedro Antonio Valdes-Sosa | Neuroscientist | | Cuba | University of Electronic Science and Technology of China | |
| 2017 | Mike Wingfield | Professor | Forestry and Agricultural Biotechnology | South Africa | University of Pretoria | |
| 2018 | Enrico Gennaro | International Relations Expert | International Cooperation | Italy | Accademia di Agricoltura di Torino | |
| 2019 | Artem R. Oganov | Crystallographer | Crystallography | Russia | Skolkovo Institute of Science and Technology | |
| 2019 | James Heckman | Economist | Economics | United States | University of Chicago | |
| 2019 | Nils Christian Stenseth | Biologist | Biology | Norway | University of Oslo | |
| 2019 | Bernard Bigot | Physicist | Physics | France | ITER | |
| 2021 | Hiria Ottino | Anthropologist | Anthropology | (French Polynesia) Tahiti | PCFA | |
| 2022 | Roger Falconer | Professor | Water Engineering | United Kingdom | Cardiff University | |
| 2022 | Hernan Ceballos | Agronomist | Cassava Breeding | Argentina | International Center for Tropical Agriculture CIAT | |
| 2024 | Yuri Gledenov | Professor | Nuclear Physics | Russia | Joint Institute for Nuclear Research | |
| 2024 | Arup Neogi | Distinguished Professor | Semiconductor Photonics, and Acoustics | United States | University of Electronic Science and Technology of China | |
| 2024 | Hans Thybo | Distinguished Professor | Geophysics | Denmark | SinoProbe Laboratory, Chinese Academy of Geological Sciences | |
| 2025 | Cosimo Bambi | Professor | Physics | Italy | Fudan University | |

== History ==
The award traces its roots to the creation of the Medal of Sino-Soviet Friendship in 1951, when it was awarded to experts from the former Soviet Union and East European countries by the then premier Zhou Enlai and the foreign minister Chen Yi. On September 15, 1955, the Chinese government decreed that each departing Soviet expert be issued a medal. This medal featured the flags of China and the Soviet Union along with the inscription "Long live the Sino-Soviet Friendship" (Chinese: 中苏友谊万岁; pinyin: Zhōng–Sū Yǒuyì Wànsuì). The friendship award was abolished with the Sino-Soviet split in the early 1960s. During the period that followed, in particular the Cultural Revolution, foreigners in China were often regarded as "spies" and very few remained in the country. The new Friendship Award was introduced by the Communist Party in 1991 following China's reopening.
