= William Lindesay =

English author, runner and conservationist

William Lindesay OBE
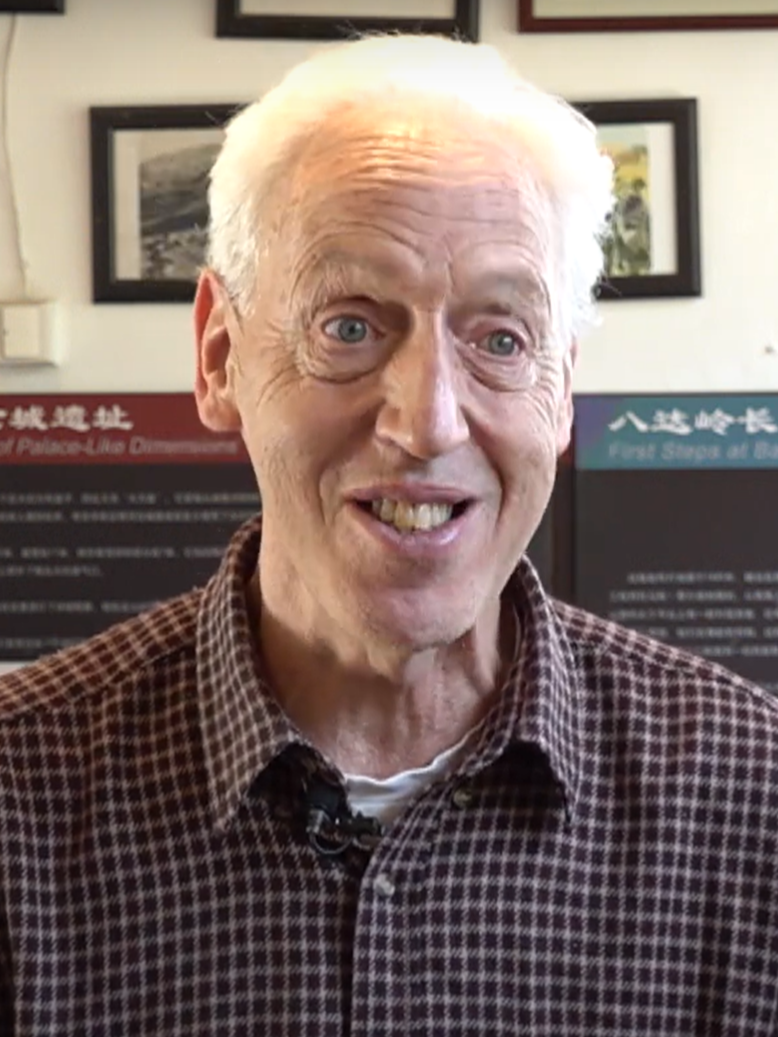
- Born: 1956 (age 69–70); Wallasey, United Kingdom
- Education: University of Liverpool (BA)
- Occupation: Conservationist
- Known for: Conservation of the Great Wall of China
- Notable work: The Great Wall in 50 Objects; The Great Wall Revisited
- Family: Clan Lindsay (Loughry Branch)
- Honours: Officer of the British Empire
- Website: https://www.wildwall.com

William Lindesay OBE (born 8 May 1956) is an English author, runner, and conservationist. He is best known for his work in protecting and conserving the Great Wall of China. He first went to China to run on the Great Wall in 1986, making the first documented traverse of the ruins on foot the following year, in 1987, in which he covered 2,470 km. He is a current honorary senior research fellow at University of Liverpool, and received the Royal Society for Asian Affairs’ Special Award in 2016.

Credited with awakening China's national consciousness to protect the Great Wall and its environment, Lindesay was the first person to discover an unmapped section of the Great Wall in the Gobi Desert, and has served as an official ambassador for Great Wall conservation since 1998 when he received the Friendship Award from the People's Republic of China.

A member of the Loughry Branch of Clan Lindsay, Lindesay is a descendant of Robert Lindesay of Loughry, a former High Sheriff of Tyrone.

== Early life and education ==
Lindesay was born in 1956 at Wallasey, Merseyside, England. He first attended school at St. Aidan's Primary School, and graduated from the University of Liverpool with a Bachelor of Arts in Geography and Geology. After his graduation in 1979, he took his first job as an oil field worker in the Gulf of Suez. In his early exploration of the Great Wall of China, he decided to run the wall in its entirety, and managed to cover 2,470 km. During this time, he was stopped by police nine times for trespassing, arrested twice, and deported once.

== Career ==
Lindesay is the author and co-author of many non-fiction books on the Great Wall of China. These include Alone on the Great Wall, The Great Wall Revisited: From the Jade Gate to Old Dragon's Head, The Great Wall in 50 Objects and others. He has lectured at Newcastle University, the University of Liverpool, the Royal Geographical Society, and has worked as anchor for Expedition Week (Walking the Great Wall) on the National Geographic Cable Channel.

In 2007, he curated The Great Wall Revisited exhibition at the Capital Museum in Beijing.

In 2012, with the help of a Mongolian geographer and the assistance of the Mongolian Armed Forces, Lindesay became the first person to discover an unmapped section of the Great Wall hidden in the Gobi Desert bordering Mongolia and China, an area he had explored extensively since 1997. Carbon dating of his discovery estimated the rammed-earth structure he found to date back to the 11th century, meaning it was likely to have been built by the Western Xia Dynasty (1038–1227).

In 2015, during an interview with The New York Times, Lindesay criticized museum curators at the Vatican Museums for refusing to grant him access to important maps and objects of research for his book, The Great Wall in 50 Objects, despite him raising $25,000 USD of the required funds. He said, "Museums are the best classrooms for knowledge and education, but some curators are like prison wardens, holding the keys, keeping the antiquities imprisoned, not allowing visitors, trying to keep people out."

In 2017, he set out to capture the Great Wall in a new way using drone photography, an idea he got from his two sons, for his upcoming book, The Great Wall: High Above and Down Below. To achieve that, he and his family covered a distance of over 9,320 miles from China to Mongolia, travelling by foot and car.

Lindesay founded WildWall in 1987, a company that provides clients with privately guided tours and retreats at the Great Wall. He is a current honorary senior research fellow at University of Liverpool.

== Awards ==
Arms of Lindesay of Loughry

Lindesay's contributions to the conservation of the Great Wall and Sino-UK relations have earned him international recognition. In 1998, he was awarded the Friendship Award – the highest award for foreign experts who have made outstanding contributions to the country's economic and social progress – by the government of the People's Republic of China for his lifelong work in conserving the Great Wall. He received the medal from former Premier Zhu Rongji. In 2006, Lindesay was included in the 2006 New Years Honours Diplomatic Service and Overseas List, and was made an Officer of the British Empire by Queen Elizabeth II for services to UK-China understanding and to international conservation of the Great Wall.

In 2008, he was named a "Top Ten National Defender of Cultural Heritage" by the Chinese government, and in 2016, he was awarded the Special Award of the Royal Society for Asian Affairs in recognition of exceptionally outstanding and unusual achievement in Asia.

=== Styles and honours ===
- Mr. William Lindesay (1956-2006)
- Mr. William Lindesay OBE (2006–Present)

== Reception ==
Lindesay's books and contributions to conservation have been well received. Writing in The South China Morning Post, author and editor Peter Gordon praised Lindesay's book The Great Wall in 50 Objects as "a brilliant achievement of alternative history" and a "fascinating and excellently constructed narrative." Publishers Weekly praised his book Alone on the Great Wall as "well-written and entertaining" with an "appeal to runners," but also criticized Lindesay for his "right-wing politics."

== Personal life ==
A member of the Loughry Branch of Scottish Clan Lindsay, Lindesay is a descendant of Robert Lindesay of Loughry, a 17th-century High Sheriff of Tyrone, Ireland, the great-grandson of Thomas Lindesay, a Lyon Depute at the Court of the Lord Lyon King of Arms, Edinburgh. He is married to Wu Qi, a Chinese historian who used to teach at Northwest University, China. Together they reside in Beijing, China, and have two children, James Lindesay and Thomas Lindesay.

== Works ==
- Alone on the Great Wall. Fulcrum Publishing: 1991. ISBN 9781555910792
- The Great Wall Revisited: From the Jade Gate to Old Dragon's Head. Harvard University Press: 2008. ISBN 9780674031494
- The Great Wall in 50 Objects. Penguin Random House: 2015.
- The Terracotta Army of the First Emperor of China. Odyssey Publications: 1999.
- Beijing. Odyssey Publications: 1999. ISBN 9789622176034
- The Great Wall Explained. China Intercontinental Press: 2012. ISBN 9787508517315
- Marching with Mao: A Biographical Journey. Trafalgar Square Publishing: 1995. ISBN 9780340556641
- The Great Wall: High Above and Down Below. Odyssey Books Maps: 2021. ISBN 9789622178878
