= Antonio Luque =

Spanish scientist

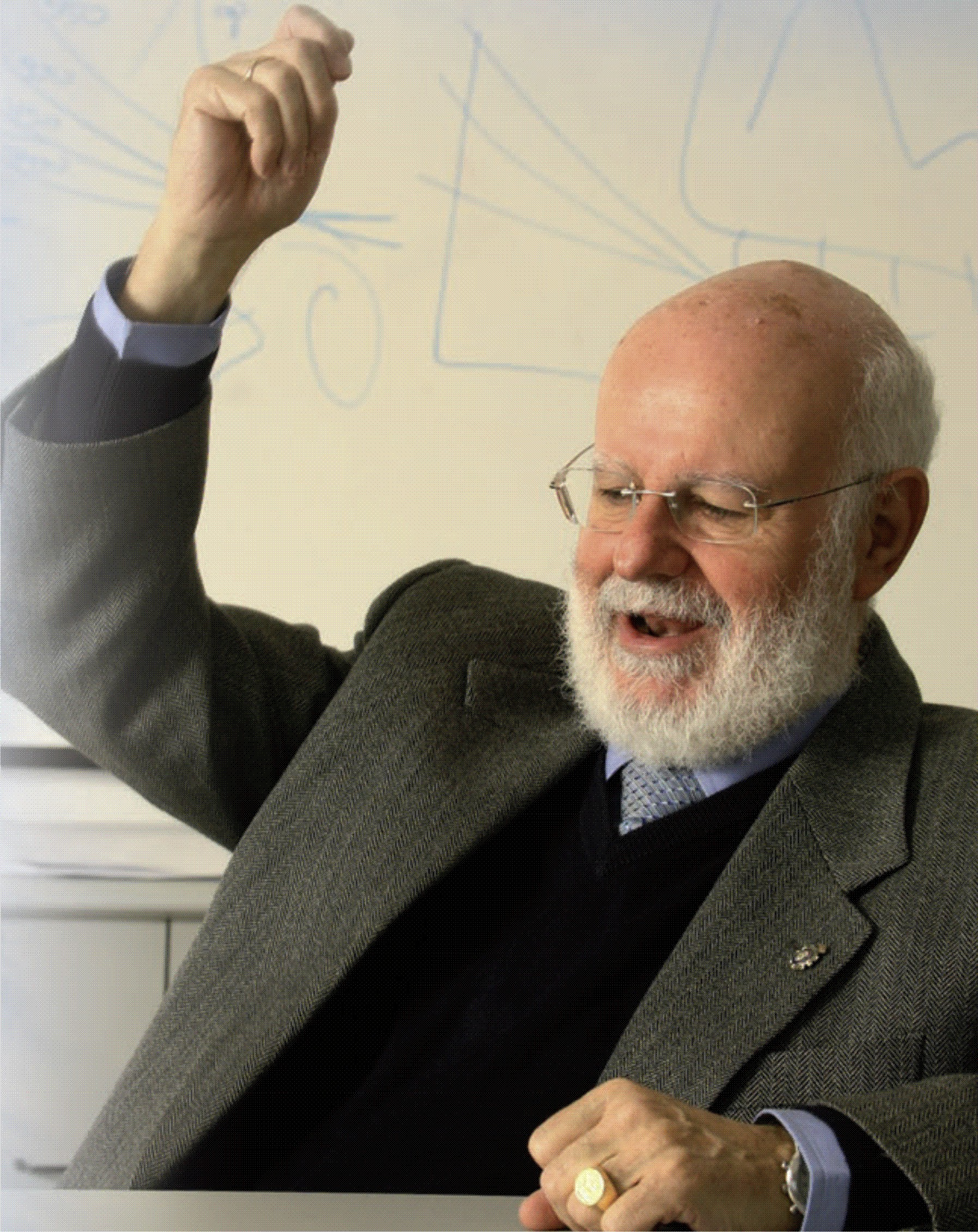
- Antonio Luque
- Born: August 15, 1941 (age 85); Malaga
- Education: Technical University of Madrid
- Known for: Invention of the bifacial solar cell and the intermediate band solar cell. Development of photovoltaic concentrator systems, solar cells, and optical devices. Foundation of the Institute of Solar Energy and of the leading PV manufacturer Isofoton.
- Awards: Spanish National Research Prize (twice), EC's Becquerel prize, King Jaime I prize, IEEE William Cherry prize, SolarWorld Einstein prize, Karl Böer Medal, three times doctor honoris causa, four times academician.
- Scientific career
- Fields: Bifacial PV solar cells, high-efficiency PV solar cells, PV concentrator systems, silicon production for PV, storage of electricity in molten silicon
- Workplaces: Technical University of Madrid, Ioffe Physical-Technical Institute of St. Petersburg
- Thesis: The construction of a ruby laser and a study of its output over time (first laser built in Spain) (1967)

Antonio Luque López (born Málaga, 15 August 1941) is a Spanish scientist and entrepreneur in the field of photovoltaic solar energy. In 1979 he founded the Institute of Solar Energy of the Technical University of Madrid (IES-UPM) and was its director till his retirement in 2017; he is currently its honorary president as well as professor emeritus in this university. He invented the bifacial solar cell in the late 1970s, today one of the mainstream solar cell technologies, and founded Isofoton in 1981 for its industrial production. He is, arguably, one of the fathers of the science and technology of concentrator photovoltaics and has been active in the research and development of high-efficiency photovoltaic conversion devices, inventing the intermediate band solar cell.

== Academic career ==
Luque graduated in Telecommunication Engineering at the Technical University of Madrid (UPM) in 1964, and in 1965 obtained a Diplôme d'Études Approfondies in Solid State Physics at the University of Toulouse. In 1967 he completed his Ph.D. at UPM. A result of his Ph.D. work was the first laser constructed in Spain in 1966, today kept at UPM's "Joaquin Serna" Museum for the History of Telecommunications. In 1969 he founded the Laboratory of Semiconductors of the School of Telecommunication Engineering at UPM. In 1974 he produced the first integrated circuit made in Spain, a differential amplifier with four transistors. He became Chair Professor of Physical Electronics at the School of Telecommunication Engineering at UPM in 1970, the youngest in Spain at the time. In 1979 founded the Institute of Solar Energy at the same university. From 1985 to 1986 he was dean of the School of Telecommunications Engineering. He has supervised more than 30 doctoral thesis seeding a generation of successful researchers in the field of photovoltaics and solid state devices such as Gabriel Sala (UPM), Luis Castañer (UPC), Gerardo López-Araujo, (UPM), Andrés Cuevas (ANU), Javier Eguren, Jesús del Álamo (MIT), Eduardo Lorenzo (UPM), Juan Carlos Miñano (UPM), Gabino Almonacid (University of Jaén), Juan Carlos Jimeno (University of the Basque Country), Antonio Martí (UPM), Adriano Moehlecke (PUCRS), Carlos del Cañizo (UPM), or Alex Mellor (Imperial College).

He has been awarded the title of doctor honoris causa by the University of Jaén and by the Charles III University of Madrid, both in 2005, and by the University of Málaga in 2014. Since 2002 he is honorary member of the Ioffe Physical-Technical Institute in Saint Petersburg. He is a member of the Engineering Academies of Russia and Belarus and of the Royal Academy of Engineering of Spain. In 2011 he was admitted to membership of the Russian Academy of Science.

His scientific work has been one of genuine inventiveness directed towards reducing the cost of photovoltaic solar energy through the development of novel technologies and conception of new devices. He is the inventor of the bifacial solar cell (1976), today a mainstream solar cell technology that can capture sunlight on both its sides. In 1981 he founded and was the first chairman of Isofoton that became the first company to mass-produce and install bifacial solar cells; although later in the 1990s it switched to a more cost-effective conventional monofacial technology, Isofoton was still extremely successful, ranking among the top 10 PV cell manufacturers worldwide throughout the first decade of the 20th century. He has worked extensively on concentrator photovoltaics (CPV): optical methods and devices for focusing the sun's rays more intensely on to the cells as well as the solar cells to efficiently convert this high radiation. Initially, in the late 1970s and early 1980s, he researched static concentrators (not needing sun tracking) for their use with bifacial solar cells. In 1989 presented the first monograph in English on CPV. In the 1990s he led the development, together with Gabriel Sala, of the EUCLIDES concentrator, a technology that was transferred to BP Solar and had its first demonstration plant in Tenerife island in 1997, being by then the biggest CPV plant in the world. In the 2000s he advocated very high concentration systems (HCPV) to tap the high efficiency of multijunction solar cells and other high efficiency cell designs, being the first to propose and develop concentration concepts with over 1000X concentration factor, that used parquets of very compact non-imaging lenses assembled into flat modules such as the conventional PV ones. In 2007 he co-founded and was the chairman of the scientific advisory committee of the Institute for Concentrator PV Systems in Puertollano that fostered the development of HCPV by tendering over 500X demo plants that resulted in 11 international companies demonstrating their technologies with plants of at least 100 kW in its premises. In parallel to his work to advance HCPV, he began, since the early 1990s, a research programme on the theory of photovoltaic devices that could circumvent the Shockley-Queisser efficiency limit that ruled for most practical solar cells at the time. Cornerstone of this new science, later dubbed as third-generation solar cells, was the workshop held in 2002 in the mountain residence the Technical University of Madrid owns in Cercedilla in the Guadarrama Sierra, that gathered the very best international photovoltaic scientists of the time, including a Nobel Laureate, to privately discuss and work on the topic. Besides theoretical work on the physical limitations of photovoltaic conversion, Luque's contribution to this field was the invention in 1997 of the intermediate band solar cell that can theoretically reach very high efficiencies over 60%, by using sub-bandgap photons. In 2006 he co-founded and was first chairman of a new IES-UPM industrial spin-off that, named Centesil, was focused on the production of polycrystalline silicon for the manufacturing of solar cells. Being a private-public partnership venture owned by the Technical University of Madrid, Complutense University of Madrid, and three companies Isofoton, DCWafers and Técnicas Reunidas, it was an initiative to build an R&D pilot plant for polysilicon purification adapted to photovoltaic applications. Currently and realizing that the next barrier to the massive adoption of solar and renewables lays in electricity storage, he works in the development of technology storage technology in the fusion latent heat of metal-grade silicon and its retrieval by means of thermophotovoltaics, a new field that has also been pioneered by IES-UPM.

He has led over 50 R&D cooperative projects, more than half of them international, having been the coordinator of 10 projects funded by the European Commission. For example, most recently, between 2003 and 2008 he coordinated the "Fullspectrum" European project that involved 19 research centers and companies for the development of photovoltaic devices to make a more efficient use of the full solar spectrum, the so-called third generation solar cells. In between 2011 and 2014 he coordinated the European part of the "NGCPV" project, a joint EU-Japan initiative on the development of high efficiency photovoltaics, that involved 15 research centers and industrial companies. From 2013 to 2017 he coordinated the research and development programme into intermediate band cells at the Ioffe Institute.

He has been member of the technical or scientific advisory councils of numerous international research institutions such as the INSA-Lyon (1991–1996) or the LITEN-CEA (2007–) in France, the Hahn Meitner Institut (2004–2008) or the Institut für Solarforschung Hameln (2005–2008) in Germany, the Higher Council of Scientific Research (1996–2000) and the Centre for Advanced Solar Photophysics (1996–2000) in the United States – a joint action by NREL and LANL – the Consejo Superior de Investigaciones Cientificas in Spain, or the European Science and Technology Assembly (1997–2000).

=== Publications ===
According to Clarivate's Web of Science, Luque's h-index is 44 (December 21, 2020) and by 2014 had published 193 articles in international scientific journals, and 279 at international conferences; two books in Spanish and five in English (one translated to Chinese), including the well-known Handbook of Photovoltaic Science and Engineering; and 21 contributions to books in English. He has taken out 24 patents. He is on the editorial panel of four international scientific journals. His most frequently cited publication, a seminal paper in the field of intermediate band solar cells, has so far (December 21, 2020), been cited over 1700 times.

In 2017 he published a historical novel in Spanish, Tras el cerco del Peñón ("Under the siege of the Rock"), set in the Mediterranean in the late 16th-century where the Spanish and Ottoman empires dispute supremacy; a novel of espionage, naval battles and piracy written in old Castilian in which some of his colleagues in the PV community are portrayed as characters. In 2018 he publishes an autobiographical book, Memorias de un investigador solar ("Memoirs of a solar scientist").

== Business links ==
In 1981 Luque founded Isofoton for the manufacturing bifacial solar cells in Málaga and was its chairman until 1989. In 1987 Isofoton stopped producing bifacial solar cells and turned to manufacture conventional monofacial solar cells, however, with big success, as it became one of the top 10 PV manufacturers worldwide throughout the first decade of the 21st century.

In the late 1990s, along with Gabriel Sala, he conducted the development of the EUCLIDES PV concentrator technology and founded ETCE-UPM that held the property of the technology and licensed it to BP Solar.

In 2006 he founded Centesil, a public-private partnership founded in Madrid, to develop new manufacturing techniques for the production of solar-grade silicon.

From 2007 to 2009 he was member of the technical advisory board of the Nitol Group in Moscow.

In 2019 he founded Silbat, together with his son Ignacio, a seasoned technology entrepreneur, for the storage of electricity in the latent heat of fusion of metal-grade silicon and its retrieval by means of thermophotovoltaics.

== Awards ==
- Leonardo Torres Quevedo National Research Prize (1987)
- Alexandre-Edmond Becquerel Prize awarded by the European Commission (1992)
- King Jaime I Prize for environmental protection (1999)
- Juan de la Cierva National Research Prize (2003)
- IEEE William Cherry Award for research in solar energy (2006).
- Einstein prize awarded by the German photovoltaic company Solar World (2008).
- Karl W. Böer Solar Energy Medal (2015).

== See also ==
- Bifacial solar cell
- Solar cell
- Solar cell research
- Theory of solar cell
- Timeline of solar cells
