= Intermediate band photovoltaics =

Intermediate band photovoltaics in solar cell research provides methods for exceeding the Shockley–Queisser limit on the efficiency of a cell. It introduces an intermediate band (IB) energy level in between the valence and conduction bands. Theoretically, introducing an IB allows two photons with energy less than the bandgap to excite an electron from the valence band to the conduction band. This increases the induced photocurrent and thereby efficiency.

== Limiting efficiencies ==
=== One band ===
Luque and Marti first derived a theoretical limit for an IB device with one midgap energy level using detailed balance. They assumed no carriers were collected at the IB and that the device was under full concentration. They found the maximum efficiency to be 63.2%, for a bandgap of 1.95eV with the IB 0.71eV from either the valence or conduction band. Under one sun illumination the limiting efficiency is 47%.

=== Infinite bands ===
Green and Brown expanded upon these results by deriving the theoretical efficiency limit for a device with infinite IBs. By introducing more IB's, even more of the incident spectrum can be utilized. After performing the detailed balance, they found the maximum efficiency to be 77.2%. This efficiency is less than that of a multijunction cell with infinite junctions. This is because in multijunction cells, electrons are captured exactly after being excited to a higher energy state, while in an IB device, the electrons still need another energy transition to reach the conduction band and be collected.

== Current technology ==
IBs have theoretical potential to become high efficiency devices, but they are hard to make. Introducing an IB greatly increases non-radiative recombination mechanisms. Additionally, IBs need to be partially filled to allow for carrier movement to and from the IB. This often requires donor carriers. The three current methods of fabricating IB devices are described below.

=== Quantum dots ===
The first method is to introduce small, homogeneous quantum dot (QD) structures into a single junction device. This creates an IB, which can be tuned by changing the shape and size of the QDs. For an experimental device to show high efficiency potential, it must demonstrate that it can generate current from the absorption of sub-bandgap photons, while preserving the output voltage of the device. Using epitaxially-grown quantum dots, some experimental devices, such as InAs/GaAs, have been able to do this. Preliminary InAs/GaAs devices have been able to produce efficiencies as high as 18.3%, although this is still lower than the comparable single junction device. Unfortunately, QD structures have several issues:

- The introduced IB is often empty, requiring donor carriers to partially fill it.
- The devices are typically only effective at low temperatures as they are prone to thermal escape.
- The use of QDs increases non-radiative recombination, which decreases sub-bandgap performance.
- Increasing the amount of QD layers can improve sub-bandgap performance, but also increases the lattice strain on the device.

Therefore, more research is needed to fabricate higher-efficiency devices. Specifically, high-density QD structures with long carrier lifetimes need to be developed and new materials need to be found to eliminate the need to use donor carriers to fill the IB.

Findings related with chemically synthesized colloidal quantum dots (CQDs) and perovskite-based photovoltaic materials have shown potentially favorable conditions to realize IB semiconductors. CQDs made of low-bandgap (in near-infrared) materials allow strong carrier confinement, high radiative lifetimes, large Bohr radius, and can overcome the main aforementioned limitations of epitaxially-grown dots. First, CQDs can be densely packed (densities up to 10^{19}–10^{20} dots/cm^{3}) in films that are highly absorbent. Second, the CQDs' size is precisely controlled, allowing for a true 3-bandgap configuration. For instance, PbS CQDs embedded in a wide-bandgap perovskite host can allow the optimum IB configuration and can provide absorption coefficients associated to the IB transitions with values (up to ~10^{5} cm^{−1}) comparable to bulk materials. Also promisingly, perovskites and CQDs combined in solution can produce epitaxially-aligned dots-in-host heterocrystals (CQD@Perovskite)_{,} where the dots are passivated by the perovskite and remain well dispersed with a concentration tuned by controlling the ratio of mixed solutions.

=== Highly mismatched alloys ===
Another method of fabricating an IB device is to use highly mismatched alloys. The use of these mismatched alloys introduces an IB due to the band anti-crossing (BAC) mechanism. This is essentially the splitting of the valence or conduction band, depending on the alloy type, into two bands. These materials are typically made of III-V alloys, however they have also been fabricated with II-VI alloys. The two most studied alloys are ZnTe doped with O and GaAs doped with N. Both of these devices have experimentally shown the absorption of sub-bandgap photons, however neither has been able to demonstrate voltage preservation. Despite this, ZnTeO devices have demonstrated a higher photocurrent and efficiency than a comparable single bandgap ZnTe device. Unfortunately, both structures exhibit efficiency less than 1%. Moving forward, more research is needed to find materials with natural partially filled IB bands.

=== Bulk materials with deep level impurities ===
Finally, the last approach is to introduce deep level impurities (DLI) into a semiconductor bulk material. This method is similar to highly mismatched alloys, however the doping percentages are much less. The biggest issue with these devices is that the non-radiative recombination, predominantly Shockley-Read-Hall, significantly increases. Significant research in this field was aimed at achieving "lifetime recovery", or the ability to increase carrier lifetime by introducing more DLIs. In particular, it was believed that lifetime recovery could be achieved by increasing the DLI concentrations to the insulator to metal transition. Krich, however, disproved this and in the process proposed a "figure of merit" to determine if materials would be suitable for high efficiency IB's. The idea was that if the non-radiative recombination lifetime was significantly higher than the transit time for an electron to move from the conduction band to the IB, then the material could increase efficiency. Essentially, the electron could reach the IB before recombining, leading to a higher induced photocurrent. This figure of merit has been used to explain why no usable device has been fabricated using highly doped silicon. Chalcogen doped silicon, in particular, have low figures of merit due to their small non-radiative recombination lifetimes. To achieve IB devices, more research needs to be done to find a bulk semiconductor material that exhibits higher non-radiative recombination lifetimes.
