= Scott Rozelle =

American development economist (born 1955)

- Born: Scott Douglas Rozelle; 1955 (age 70–71); Los Angeles, California, US

Academic background
- Education: University of California, Berkeley Haas School of Business (BS); Cornell University (PhD)

Academic work
- Discipline: Rural education, Agricultural policy
- Institutions: Stanford University
- Website: web.stanford.edu/~rozelle profiles.stanford.edu/scott-rozelle

Scott Douglas Rozelle (simplified Chinese: 罗斯高; traditional Chinese: 羅斯高; pinyin: luó sīgāo, born 1955) is an American development economist currently serving as a researcher at the Freeman Spogli Institute for International Studies and one of the co-directors of the Rural Education Action Program (REAP) at Stanford University. As of the late 2010s, Rozelle has spent over 30 years doing research heavily based on the agriculture, economics, and education of mainland China.

== Biography ==
Scott Rozelle was born on a ranch located in Los Angeles, California in 1955 as a fifth-generation Californian. His father was an agricultural economist who owned a commercial agribusiness magazine that initially introduced agriculture to him. At the time, few high schools in the country could provide Chinese classes to students; however, since the U.S. government made efforts to enhance Chinese language education even before its diplomatic relations with China were re-established, Rozelle was able to learn Chinese at his own junior high school in 1966, at the age of 12. In 1974, Rozelle was completing his undergraduate studies at Cornell University but eventually stayed in Taiwan for three years through a student exchange program, although he originally planned to stay there for only three months.

As China–United States relations were being normalized in 1979, Rozelle received a B.S. degree from the Haas School of Business at the University of California, Berkeley. While he was working toward his Masters at Cornell in 1982, Rozelle attempted to perform researches regarding "the system of contract labor in rural areas" in Shandong, China through applying for the fund by the United States National Science Foundation. Nevertheless, the plan was not successful and Rozelle ended up leaving school temporarily to work until about two years later, he was sent to China by Cornell as an instructor of Western economics upon receiving an invitation from Nanjing Agricultural University. Due to his strong interest in "poverty alleviation in rural areas", Rozelle picked hybrid rice production as the subject of his doctoral dissertation and acquired his Ph.D. from the Department of Agricultural Economics of Cornell University in 1991.

In 1995, with the joint effort from Jikun Huang, a Chinese agricultural economist he met during a meeting of the International Rice Research Institute in Manila, Philippines, Rozelle co-founded the Center for Chinese Agricultural Policy that later became a part of the Chinese Academy of Sciences in Beijing, China. He was also an assistant professor at the Food Research Institute at Stanford University through 1990 to 1997 and started serving as a professor of Agricultural and Resource Economics at the University of California, Davis since 1997. Since 2006, Rozelle has been a Helen Farnsworth Endowed Senior Fellow at both the Freeman Spogli Institute of International Studies and the Department of Economics at Stanford.

== Research ==
Rozelle knows Chinese well and his research is mostly associated with agricultural policies, economic institutions, and poverty and inequality in China. Over the years, Rozelle has published some 300 articles related to development problems of China, in journals such as the Journal of Economic Literature, Science, Nature, and The American Economic Review.

Additionally, he has made efforts to improve the living condition of school-aged children, such as suggesting plans for nutrition and educational efficiency. Through his perennial research, Rozelle indicated that the education in China has downsides that reflect noticeable disadvantages of the poor people, given billions of yuan Chinese government spent on education systems would possibly "go to waste" if students are not in a proper health condition.

=== Iron-deficiency anemia ===
According to a report published by Chinese magazine Caixin in 2015, Rozelle's team collected data in regions such as Shaanxi, Gansu, Qinghai and Ningxia, and concluded that, in northwestern China, iron-deficiency anemia appeared to be common for nearly 40% of students in fourth and fifth grade, causing poor health condition to children in rural areas. During his visits to numerous villages, Rozelle noticed that food varieties such as steamed buns, noodles, and rice compromised a major portion of rural children's diet, whereas meat and fresh vegetables and fruit were pretty scarce. In response to situations like this, the Chinese government implemented a policy that would provide every child in poor areas with healthy lunches, at the cost of 3 to 4 yuan each. But Rozelle's team made the estimation that only two daily servings of fresh vegetables and meat costing 7 to 8 yuan each would suffice the amount of iron needed for those children, meaning a real effective solution could largely increase the demand for funds. A possible approach Rozelle put forth was helping them to fight against the anemia by introducing vitamin tablets – the effect of which would not be optimal, but it would cost way less and help much more.

=== Intestinal parasite ===
In Guizhou and other regions in southern China where climates are similar, Rozelle discovered that intestinal parasites were affecting several million school-aged children. 50% of children in the areas being investigated suffered from at least one type of parasite, such as roundworm, hookworm, and whip worm. Rozelle's team filed relevant reports to local governments in 2010 in an attempt to highlight the seriousness, but the issue had not been resolved promptly, as Rozelle observed in another visit to Guizhou 3 years later that parasites still persisted. Even so, he did not give up proposing potential solutions by pointing out that one deworming tablet would cost 2 yuan and taking two every six months would be enough for a child to get rid of parasites in a timely manner.

=== Nearsightedness ===
Rozelle calculated that, on average, nearsightedness could be found on 30% of China's students aging from 10 to 12, yet he visited thousands of primary schools in the rural areas and found out that wearing glasses was not common at all, and only one or two out of one hundred middle school students had a pair of glasses. This led to further failure for the vision problems of 24% primary school students and 57% middle school students to be treated promptly, even though, Rozelle discovered, these students' academic performances were heavily affected by their vision.

== Awards and honors ==
- The Friendship Award (2008)
- The National Science and Technology Collaboration Award (2009)

== Selected works ==
- Wang, Jinxia; Huang, Jikun; Rozelle, Scott; Huang, Qiuqiong; Blanke, Amelia (2007). "Agriculture and groundwater development in northern China: trends, institutional responses, and policy options". Water Policy. 9 (Supplement 1). Center for Chinese Agricultural Policy, Institute of Geographical Sciences and Natural Resources Research, Chinese Academy of Sciences; Department of Agricultural and Resource Economics, University of California, Davis: 61–74. doi:10.2166/wp.2007.045. S2CID 154361986.
- Swinnen, Johan F.M.; Rozelle, Scott (2009). "Governance Structures and Resource Policy Reform: Insights from Agricultural Transition". Annual Review of Resource Economics. 1. Department of Economics and LICOS Centre for Institutions and Economic Performance, University of Leuven; Freeman Spogli Institute, Stanford University: 33–54. doi:10.1146/annurev.resource.050708.144122.
- Huang, Qiuqiong; Wang, Jinxia; Msangi, Siwa; Rozelle, Scott; Huang, Jikun (2014). "Agricultural water management at the village level in northern China". In Burnett, Kimberly; Howitt, Richard; Roumasset, James A.; Wada, Christopher A. (eds.). Routledge Handbook of Water Economics and Institutions. Routledge. pp. 341–362. ISBN 978-13-179-1624-6.
- Huang, Jikun; Rozelle, Scott (2014). "The Role of Agriculture in China's Development: Performance, policy determinants of success, and lessons for Africa". In Falcon, Walter P.; Naylor, Rosamond L. (eds.). Frontiers in Food Policy: Perspectives on Sub-Saharan Africa. Stanford Center on Food Security and the Environment. pp. 449–482. ISBN 978-14-975-1655-7.
- Wang, Jinxia; Zhang, Lijuang; Huang, Qiuqiong; Huang, Jikun; Rozelle, Scott (2014). "Assessment of the Development of Groundwater Market in Rural China". In Easter, K. William; Huang, Qiuqiong (eds.). Water Markets for the 21st Century. Springer Nature. pp. 263–282. ISBN 978-94-017-9081-9.
