= Arvind Victor Shah =

Swiss electronics engineer, educator and scientist

Arvind V. Shah
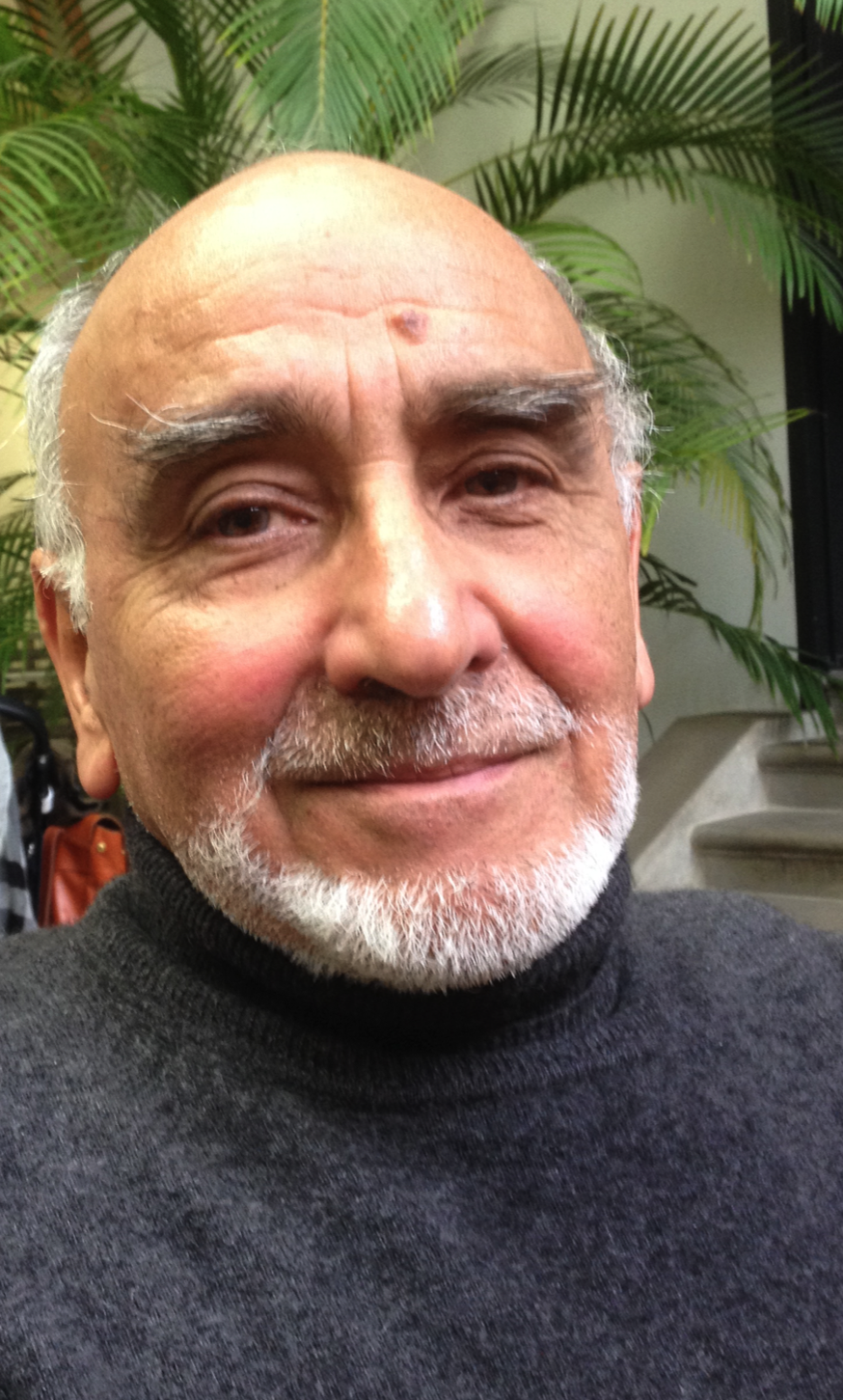
- Shah in 2018
- Born: December 4, 1940 (age 85); Bombay, India
- Occupations: Electronics engineer, educator, scientist
- Years active: 1969–present

Arvind Victor Shah (born December 4, 1940) is a Swiss electronics engineer, educator and scientist. He founded the Centre For Electronics Design And Technology (CEDT) at the Indian Institute of Science, Bangalore, in 1974, where he was co-director during its first four years. Thereafter, he became full professor for electronics at the University of Neuchâtel in Switzerland. Because of his interest for the field of photovoltaics, he initiated in 1985 the Photovoltaic Laboratory within the Institute of Microtechnology (IMT) in Neuchâtel. In 1987, Shah became part-time professor of electronic materials at the École polytechnique fédérale de Lausanne (EPFL) in addition to his duties at the University of Neuchâtel. He pioneered, together with his team at IMT, a new type of thin-film solar cell, the micromorph tandem solar cell.

== Life ==
Shah was born in India to an Indian father and an Italo-Swiss mother. His family left India in 1945 and settled in Switzerland in 1948. Arvind V. Shah was educated in Zürich. He studied Electrical Engineering at the ETH Zurich, where he received his diploma (1964) and his Ph.D. degree (1969) at the Institute of Applied Physics. He remained at this Institute of the ETHZ as lecturer, student advisor and coordinator for projects with industry until 1975. During this period, he pursued his plan to contribute to the education of engineers in India. For this purpose, he contacted the Swiss Agency for Development and Cooperation (SDC) as well as the relevant authority in India (Electronics Commission of the Government of India). Both parties agreed to his proposal for establishing a new Electronics Centre in Bangalore as part of the Indian Institute of Science. As a consequence, he moved back to India to become co-director, together with his Indian colleague Prof. B. S. Sonde, of the new Centre for Electronics Design and Technology (CEDT). In 1979, Shah accepted a call to become professor at the University of Neuchâtel in the French-speaking part of Switzerland. He specialized in materials science and thin-film technology. In particular, he studied the design and fabrication of optoelectronic devices, such as solar cells. In 1986, his team developed a process for Very High Frequency Plasma Deposition (VHF plasma). In 1987, Shah took on an additional, subsidiary position as part-time professor of electronic materials at the École Polytechnique Fédérale de Lausanne (EPFL), one of only two Swiss Federal Institutes of Technology. Using VHF plasma technology, his group was able to deposit microcrystalline silicon layers as a new photoactive material for solar cells. By combining a microcrystalline with an amorphous silicon layer, a new type of thin-film tandem solar cell was introduced by Shah's group in 1994, under the name of micromorph solar cell. It features high conversion efficiency over a wide spectrum of infrared and visible light. Shah drew on his experience for cooperation between universities and industries to find licensees for the industrialization of the solar cells pioneered by his group. The Swiss company OC Oerlikon took a license in 2003 to provide manufacturing equipment for the fabrication of such cells. This activity was subsequently sold to Tokyo Electron (TEL) and became integrated into the TEL Solar Division.

In 2007, Shah was recipient of the Becquerel Prize for his lifetime contributions to solar cell technology. This prize was initiated by the European Commission to honour one person for outstanding merits in photovoltaics every year.

Shah retired in 2005. Thereafter, he continued working as consultant to companies and organizations in various countries. For this purpose he founded the company Elmvoltaics GmbH. He also became active as politician of the Green Party of Switzerland. To create a level playing field for solar cells imported from China, he proposed a label to identify solar cells adhering to ecological standards. As expert on solar panels, he voiced his concerns about Swiss regulations to achieve more usage of alternative energy sources.

Arvind Shah is married to Brigitte Shah and has three daughters.

== Publications ==
- A. V. Shah published or co-authored over 370 scientific publications (almost all in English; over 10,000 citations).
- Some of his publications addressed a broader public to inform about the role of electrical energy in general and proposals for Swiss politics.
