= Roger Van Overstraeten =

Belgian electronics engineer (1937–1999)

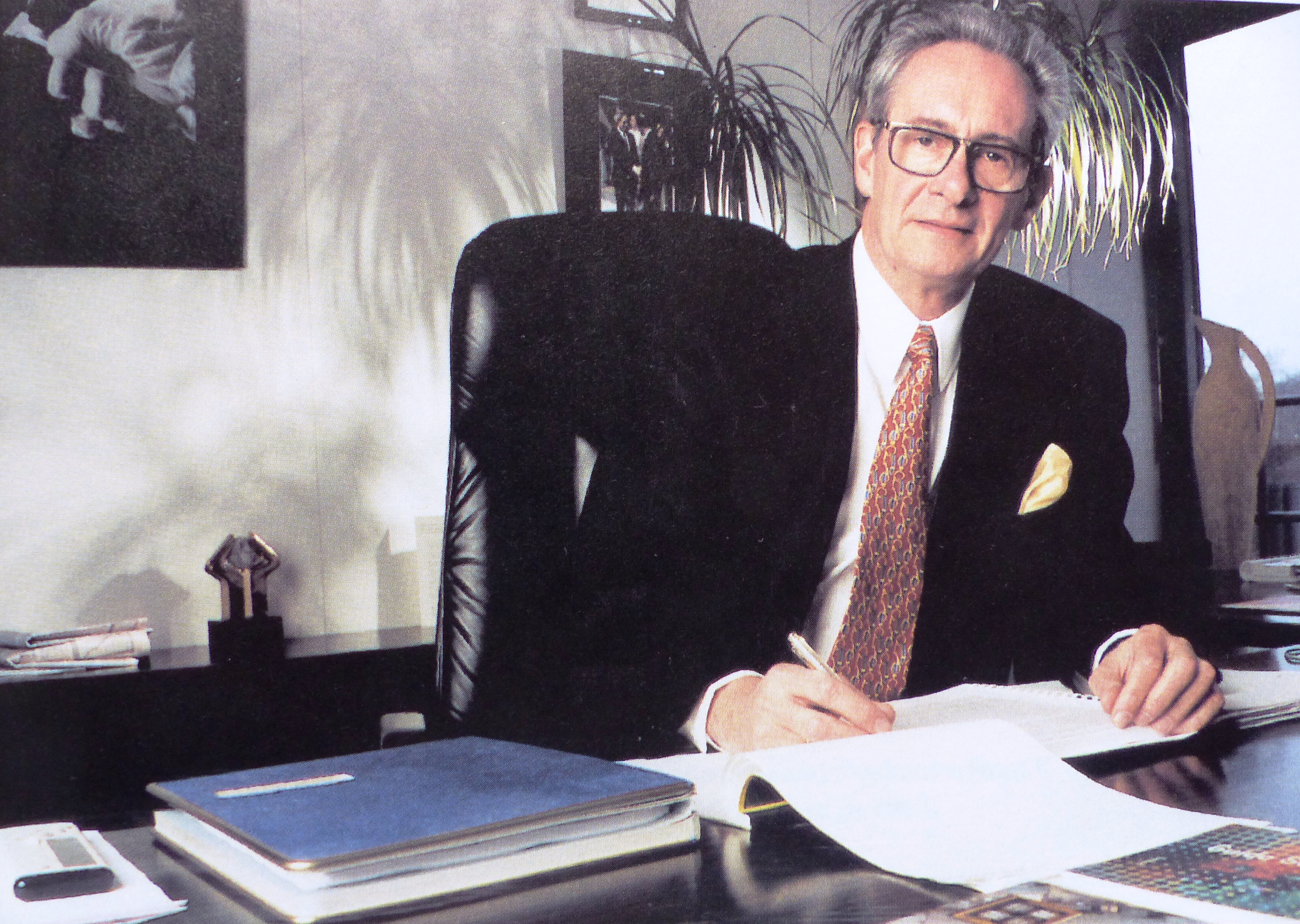
Roger Van Overstraeten

Roger Joseph, Baron Van Overstraeten (7 December 1937, Vlezenbeek – 29 April 1999, Leuven) was a professor at the Catholic University of Leuven and later the Katholieke Universiteit te Leuven, an IEEE Fellow and the founder of the micro- and nanoelectronics research center IMEC.

Van Overstraeten earned a PhD from Stanford University in 1963.

== Honors and awards ==
In 1989 he was awarded the first Becquerel Prize by the European Commission.

In 1990 Van Overstraeten was elevated to Baron and he received the IEEE Frederik Philips Award (1999).
