= Pavel Talalay =

Russian professor

Pavel Grigorievich Talalay
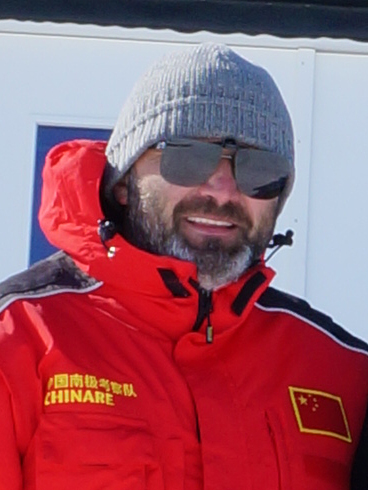
- Pavel Talalay in Greenland, 2017
- Born: October 14, 1962 (age 63); St. Petersburg, Russia
- Title: Professor of Engineering
- Spouse: Ekaterina Talalay
- Children: Grigorii Talalay, Anastasiia Talalay, Evdokiia Ostashevskaia, Kseniia Treydel, Efrosiniia Talalay

Pavel Grigorievich Talalay (Russian: Павел Григорьевич Талалай) (born October 14, 1962), is a Russian professor of drilling engineering and director of the Institute for Polar Science and Engineering in Jilin University, Changchun, China. His research interests are focused on different features of drilling technology in ice and permafrost; dynamics of ice sheets; ice properties and environmental issues in polar regions.

== Career ==
Talalay acquired Drilling Engineer (1984), Ph.D. (1995) and Doctor of Engineering (2007) degrees at the Saint Petersburg Mining University of Russia, where he has also worked as Professor and Chair of Department of Descriptive Geometry and Engineering Drawing. Talalay was a guest Researcher in the Niels Bohr Institute of Copenhagen University, Denmark (1998-1999). In 2010, Talalay was invited to work at Jilin University within the framework of the Chinese state program “Attracting 1000 highly qualified specialists”. Later, Talalay became the Director of the Polar Research Center of Jilin University. Since 2009, Talalay is a member of Technical Assistance Board, U.S. NSF Ice Drilling Program (IDP) of the University of Wisconsin–Madison, USA. In 2023-2024 Prof Talalay was the leader of the Chinese-Russian drilling project to study the in-situ dynamics and conditions at the bed of the Northwestern Princess Elizabeth Land, East Antarctic Ice Sheet. The project succeeded in penetration through the 545 m thick ice and recovered the unique 0.48 m bedrock sample. Talalay is a member of Steering Committee of SCAR Groundwater Action Group. Talalay is the author of over 200 publication, 90 patents, and 20 books, book-chapters and textbooks, most notable of which are Mechanical Ice Drilling Technology, Thermal Ice Drilling Technology, Geotechnical and Exploration Drilling in the Polar Regions. and Mining and Construction in Snow and Ice.

== Expeditions in Antarctica and the Arctic ==
Talalay participated in six field expeditions in Antarctica and the Arctic. In 1999-2001 he took part in the North Greenland Ice Core Project (NorthGRIP) yielded the deepest borehole in Greenland ice sheet (3085 m; 2003). He has been a part in a Russian project to create deepest borehole in ice at Vostok Station, Antarctica that contacted in February 2012 with the subglacial Lake Vostok at a depth 3769.3 m. In 2019, Talalay lead a research project that yielded the first bedrock sample beneath East Antarctica, near the Zhongshan Station, in more than 60 years.

== Awards and recognition ==
Talalay was awarded the Second-Class Diploma of IV All-Russian context of science-popular articles “Science-Society-2005”, 2006 International Geneva Salon of Inventions Gold Medal, won the 2009 International Contest on 3D-Moldelling. In 2014, he was awarded the Chinese Government's Friendship Award for “outstanding contribution to the country's economic and social progress”. In 2024, Talalay was elected a full member of the Russian Academy of Mining Sciences, and in 2025, he was elected a foreign academician of the Chinese Academy of Engineering.

== Bibliography ==
- Talalay PG (2025) Ice core methods. Ice core drilling. In: S Elias (Ed) Encyclopedia of Quaternary Science, 3rd Edition, Vol. 3, Elsevier, UK, pp 45-62. ISBN 978-0-443-29997-1
- Talalay PG (2024) Mining and construction in snow and ice. From test pits to long tunnels. Springer Cham, 252 p. ISBN 978-3-031-76507-0
- Talalay PG (2022) Geotechnical and exploration drilling in the polar regions. Springer Cham, 387 p. ISBN 978-3-031-07268-0
- Talalay PG (2021) The technicalities of ice drilling. In: G Foscari (Ed) Antarctic Resolution. UNLESS, pp 252-255. ISBN 978-3-03778-640-6
- Talalay PG (2020) Thermal ice drilling technology. Springer Geophysics, 278 p. ISBN 978-981-13-8847-7
- Zacny K, Paulsen G, Bar-Cohen Y, Bao X, Badescu M, Lee HJ, Sherrit S, Zagorodnov V, Thompson L, and Talalay P (2016) Drilling and breaking ice. In: Y Bar-Cohen (Ed) Low temperature materials and mechanisms. CRC Press, pp 271-347. ISBN 978-1-4987-0039-9
- Talalay PG (2016) Mechanical ice drilling technology. Springer Geophysics, 284 p. ISBN 978-981-10-0559-6
- Talalay PG (2014) Foundations of drilling engineering. Geological Publishing House, Beijing, China, 194 p. ISBN 978-7-116-08971-6
- Talalay PG (2011) Nachertatel'naya geometriya na primerah: Uchebnoe posobie [Descriptive geometry with examples: Textbook]. Saint-Petersburg, BHV-Peterburg, 270 p. ISBN 978-5-9775-0641-0
- Talalay PG (2010) Nachertatel'naya geometriya. Inzhenernaya grafika. Internet-testirovanie bazovyh znanij [Descriptive geometry. Engineering graphics. Online testing of basic knowledge]. Saint-Petersburg, Lan', 288 p. ISBN 978-5-8114-1078-1
- Talalay PG (2010) KOMPAS-3D V11 na primerah [COMPAS-3D V11 with examples]. Saint-Petersburg, BHV-Peterburg, 624 p. ISBN 978-5-9775-0414-0
- Talalay PG (2010) Komp'yuternyj kurs nachertatel'noj geometrii na baze KOMPAS-3D [Computer course in descriptive geometry based on KOMPAS-3D]. Saint-Petersburg, BHV-Peterburg, 608 p. ISBN 978-5-9775-0440-9
- Talalay PG (2008) KOMPAS-3D V9 na primerah [COMPAS-3D V11 with examples]. Saint-Petersburg, BHV-Peterburg, 592 p. ISBN 978-5-9775-0141-5
- Ueda HT and Talalay PG (2007). Fifty years of Soviet and Russian drilling activity in Polar and Non-Polar ice. A chronological history. Cold Region Research and Engineering Laboratory, Hanover, USA, ERDC/CRREL TR-07-20, 131 p. http://hdl.handle.net/11681/5303
- Bobin NE, Talalay PG, and Eist YuA (2003) Inzhenernaya grafika. Nachertatel'naya geometriya: Uchebnoe posobie po resheniyu kontrol'nyh zadach [Engineering graphics. Descriptive geometry: Textbook for solving testing tasks]. Saint-Petersburg, Saint-Petersburg State Mining Institute, 73 p.
- Bobin NE, Talalay PG, Galushkin SS, Muraev YuD, Onishchin VP, Pashkevich VM, and Eist YuA (2002) Inzhenernaya grafika. Osnovy nachertatel'noj geometrii, chercheniya, i mashinnoj grafiki: Uchebnoe posobie [Engineering graphics. Fundamentals of descriptive geometry, drawing and machine graphics: Textbook]. Saint-Petersburg, Saint-Petersburg State Mining Institute, 94 p.
- Chistyakov VK, Talalay PG, Yakovlev AM, and Yakovlev AA (1999) Promyvochnye sredy dlya bureniya skvazhin v merzlyh porodah i l'dah [Circulating mediums for drilling in frozen rocks and ice]. Moscow, Geoinformmark, 78 p.
- Talalay PG and Gundestrup NS (1999) Hole fluids for deep ice core drilling: A review. University of Copenhagen, Copenhagen, 120 p. doi.org/10.2312/report_icedrill
- Litvinenko VS, Talalay PG, and Chistyakov VK (1996) Promyvochnye sredy dlya bureniya skvazhin v kriolitozone i lednikah: Uchebnoe posobie [Circulation mediums for drilling in permafrost and glaciers: Textbook]. Saint-Petersburg, Saint-Petersburg State Mining Institute, 69 p.
- Kudryashov BB, Talalay PG, and Chistyakov VK (1991). Burenie skvazhin v snezhno-firnovyh i ledovyh tolshchah za rubezhom [Drilling ice and snow-firn formations abroad]. Tekhnika, tekhnol. i organizaciya geol.-razved. rabot: Obzor [Technique, technology and organization of geological exploration: An overview] Moscow, VIEMS Publishing House, 57 p.
- Bobin NE. Vasiliev NI, Kudryashov BB, Stepanov GK, and Talalay PG (1988). Mekhanicheskoe burenie skvazhin vo l'du: Uchebnoe posobie [Mechanical drilling in ice: Textbook]. Leningrad, Leningrad Mining Institute, 90 p.
