= Mechtild Rothe =

German politician (born 1947)

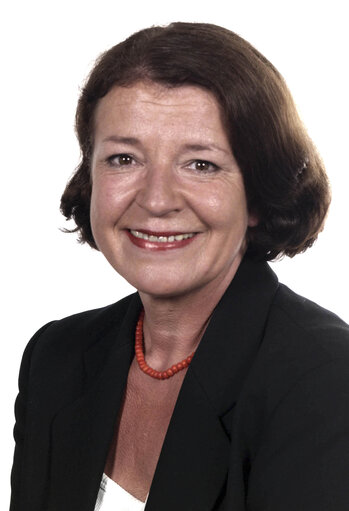
- Born: 10 August 1947 (age 79); Paderborn, Germany
- Occupation: Politician
- Years active: 1965—present

Mechtild Rothe (born 10 August 1947 in Paderborn) is a German politician who served as a Member of the European Parliament from 1984 until 2009. She is a member of the Social Democratic Party of Germany, part of the Socialist Group.

During her time in parliament, Rothe sat on the European Parliament's Committee on Industry, Research and Energy. She was a substitute for the Committee on Foreign Affairs, a member of the Delegation for relations with the countries of south-east Europe and a substitute for the Delegation to the EU-Turkey Joint Parliamentary Committee.

== Education ==
- 1965–1974: Trained and employed as a chemical laboratory technician
- 1974–1978: studied German and social sciences
- 1978 and 1981: first and second state examination for lower secondary teaching
- 1978–1984: worked as a teacher

== Career ==
- 1984–2009: Member of the European Parliament
- Vice-Chair of the SPD group in the European Parliament
- 1999–2004: Delegation Chair of the EU – Cyprus Joint Parliamentary Committee
- 2002–2004: Member of the Group Bureau

== See also ==
- 2004 European Parliament election in Germany
