= Adolf Goetzberger =

German physicist (1928–2023)

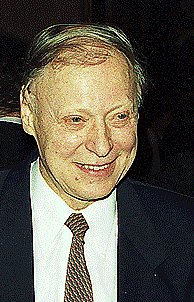
Image of Adolf Goetzberger

Adolf Goetzberger (29 November 1928 – 24 February 2023) was a German physicist.

== Life and career ==
Goetzberger studied physics in Munich, Germany. He finished his university studies with a work over Über die Kristallisation aufgedampfter Antimonschichten. He worked together with William Shockley in Palo Alto, California and for company Bell Labs. In 1981, Goetzberger founded Fraunhofer Institute for Solar Energy Systems ISE in Freiburg im Breisgau.

Goetzberger died on 24 February 2023, at the age of 94.

== Awards ==
- J J Ebers Award
- European Inventor Award
- Doctor honoris by University of Freiburg, 1971
- Honorary doctorate from the Faculty of Science and Technology at Uppsala University, Sweden, 1995
- Karl Boer medal, 1997
- Becquerel Prize, 1997
- William R. Cherry Award, 1997
- Einstein Award, 2006
- European Solar Award, 2009
- Officer's Cross of the Order of Merit of the Federal Republic of Germany
- Order of Merit of Baden-Württemberg
