= Andres Cuevas =

Professor of engineering at the Australian National University, Canberra

Andres Cuevas is an Australian electrical engineer. He is a professor of engineering at the Australian National University, Canberra. He was named a Fellow of the Institute of Electrical and Electronics Engineers (IEEE) in 2014 for contributions to the science and technological development of silicon solar cells.

Cuevas had studied silicon solar cells at the Technical University of Madrid, where he got his M.Eng. in 1976. He then went to Stanford University, where he was a Fulbright Fellow until 1980, when he graduated with a Ph.D. Between 2007 and 2010, Cuevas served as head of the ANU School of Engineering, and from 2013 to 2014 was deputy dean of the College of Engineering and Information Technology. He is an associate editor of the IEEE Journal of Photovoltaics and the Physica Status Solidi.

He was awarded the Becquerel Prize in 2015 by the European Commission for his work on the development and characterisation of silicon solar cells.
