= Nuna 5 =

2009 Dutch solar-powered racing car model

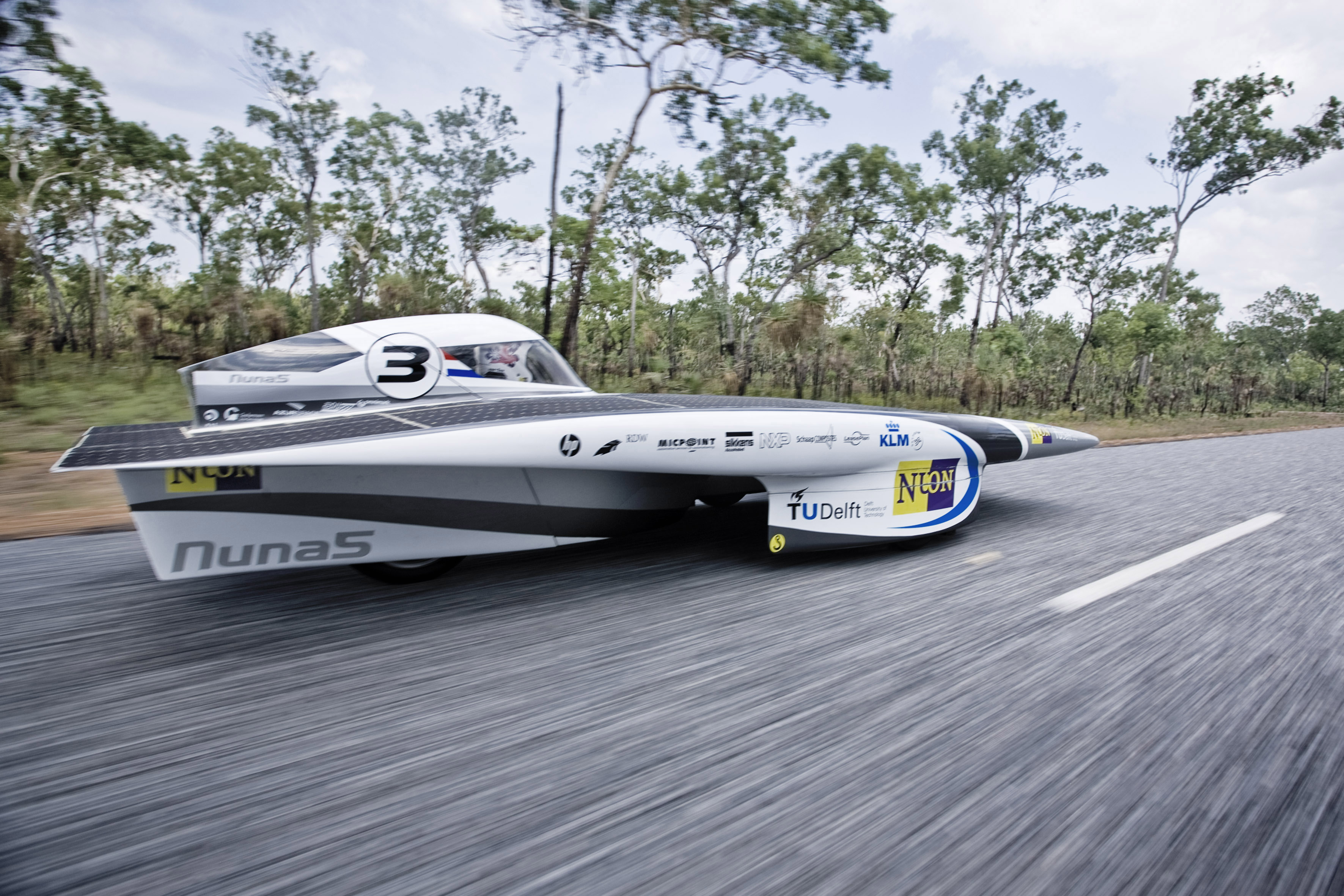
Nuna 5

The Nuna 5 is the 2009 model of the Nuna series solar-powered racing car built by the Dutch Nuon Solar Team.

In October 2009, Nuna 5 ran second, in a field of twenty-five, in the World Solar Challenge in Australia.

It completed the 3,021 km (1,877 mi) race in 32 hours 38 minutes, having an average speed of 91.9 km/h (57.1 miles/h).

== History ==
The Nuon Solar Team has won the World Solar Challenge four times (in a row) with Nuna in (2001), Nuna 2 (2003), Nuna 3 (2005) and Nuna 4 (2007).

The 2001 win was the first time a new team won the World Solar Challenge. At that time was called the Alpha Centauri Team.

The 2009 Nuon Solar Team consists of 14 students from Delft University of Technology. As in previous years, Dutch energy supplier Nuon is the main sponsor of the team. The team is assisted and advised by professor and former astronaut Wubbo Ockels.

In July 2010. Nuon Solar Team and Nuna5 visited Japan. They visited several universities and city offices. In August 2010, Nuna 5 ran third, in the Suzuka Dream Cup in Japan.

== Design and production ==
The Nuon Solar Team began designing Nuna5 on a full-time basis in September 2008. After two series of wind tunnel tests at the Low Turbulence Tunnel laboratory of Delft University of technology in December and January, the aerodynamic design was finished late January 2009.

The team began building the car in February 2009. The body was built from carbon fiber at Schaap Composites shipyard in Lelystad, which is known for having built the ABN Amro Volvo Ocean Race boats.

The car was involved in a serious crash on October 5, 2009, while on a practice drive in Australia. A tire burst while the car was traveling at 110 km/h [68 mph], causing the car to run off the road sustaining severe damage.

== Solar panel ==
Like previous Nunas, Nuna 5 will be equipped with Gallium Arsenide triple junction solar cells. The solar cells have an estimated efficiency of 34% and are normally used on solar panels in space. By regulations it is allowed to carry 6 square meters of solar cells. Due to the type of solar cells on Nuna 5, it competed in the Challenge Class of the World Solar Challenge.

== World Solar Challenge 2009 - new regulations ==
The 2009 regulations are comparable to those from 2007 (the year Nuna 4 raced). The major change was the diminished battery weight, changing from 30 kg in 2007 to 25 kg.

Other changes required cars not be allowed to race on, previously used, slicks (smooth tires), requiring profiled (treaded or grooved) tires. Also, the driver was required to sit more upright with a seating angle of, at most, 27 degrees.

== Technical specifications ==
Technical stats on Nuna 5
| Measurements | Length: 4.82 m Width: 1.76 m Height: 0.90 m |
| Weight (excluding driver) | 155 kg |
| Driver weight | Minimum 80 kg (using added weights) |
| Number of wheels | 3 |
| Number of solarcells | 2120 cells (Gallium‐Arsenide Triple Junction) |
| Solarcells surface | 6 m^{2} (new 2007 rules maximum) |
| Efficiency solarcells | 34% |
| Maximum speed | Approximately 140–150 km/h |
| Engine | InWheel Direct Drive Electric Engine (Efficiency: 97 – 99%) |
| Battery | 25 kg Lithium-ion polymer |
| Body | Carbon fiber and Twaron (aramidfibre)/ Titanium rollbar |
| Front wheel suspension | Double wishbone of carbon fibre / Metal springs which incorporate shocks / Carbon fiber shock absorber/ Aluminium rims / Ceramic bearings |
| Rear wheel suspension | Horizontal fork of carbon fiber / Aluminium connection points |
| Front brakes | Custom ceramic brakedisc / Aramid breaklines |
| Rear brakes | Regenerative brake |
| Tyres | (profiled tyres) |
| Rolling resistance | 10 times less than an average car |
| Air resistance | 12 times less than an average car |
| Telemetry | WiFi to support car |
| Number plate | ZZ-87-10 |
