= Nuna 6 =

2011 Dutch solar-powered racing car model

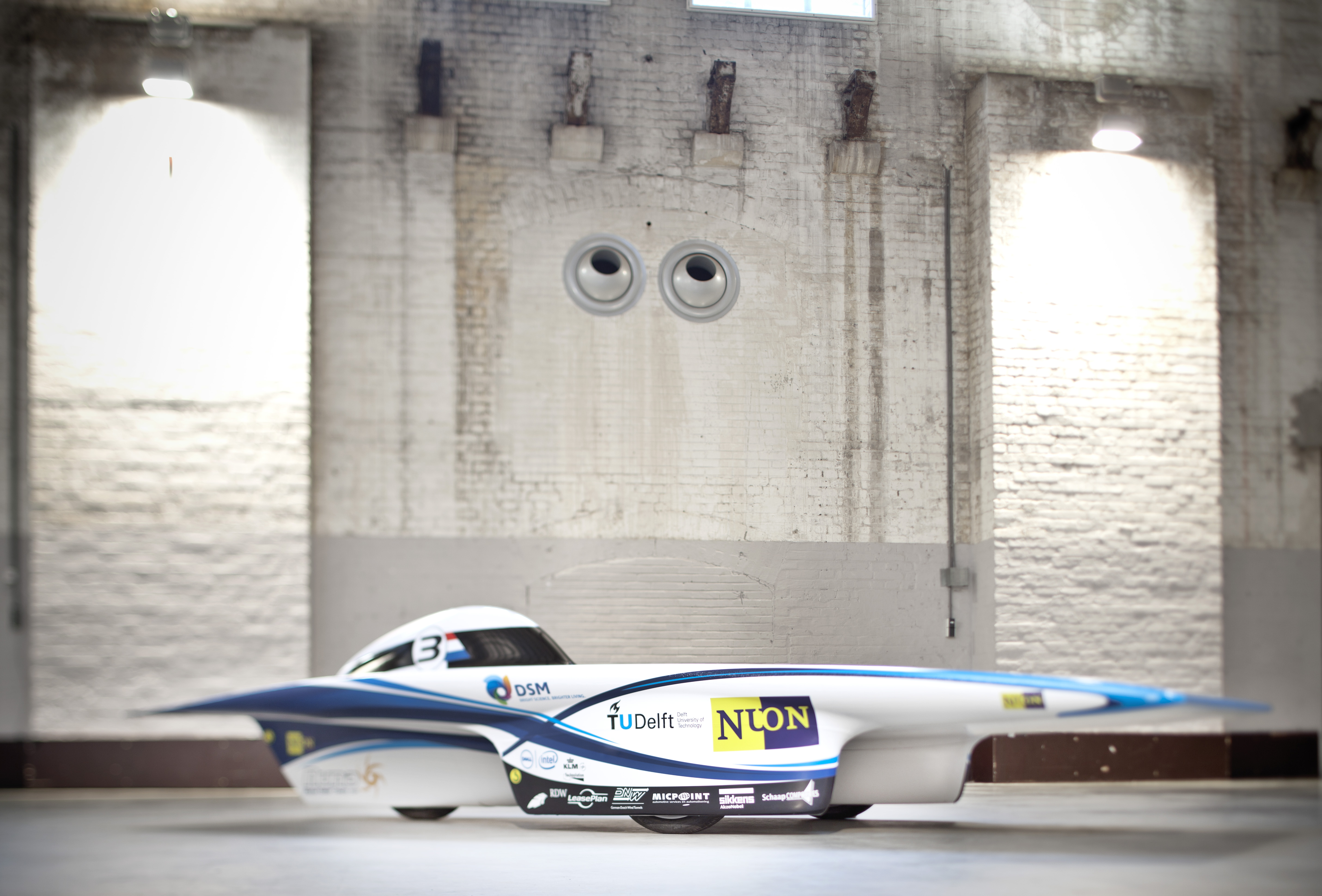
Nuna 6

The Nuna 6 is the 2011 model solar-powered racing car in the Nuna series built by the Dutch Nuon Solar Team. Nuna 6 has been built by students who are part of the Nuon Solar Team at the Delft University of Technology in the Netherlands. Nuna 6 weighs 145 kg, and is therefore lighter than the previous 5 cars.

In October 2011, Nuna 6 finished second in the 11th World Solar Challenge in Australia.

== World Solar Challenge 2011 - New regulations ==
The 2011 regulations are comparable to those from 2009 (the year Nuna 5 raced). The major change was that the solar panel of 6 m2 has to be made from silicon solar cells or has to be limited to 3 m2 for other high grade solar cells like the previously used triple junction GaAs solar cells which are mostly used in space.

Nuna 6 will use 6 m2 of monocrystalline silicon cells which will be about 22% efficient (high grade cells might be up to 35% efficient).

== Technical specifications ==
Technical stats on Nuna 6
Measurements	Length: 4.44 m Width: 1.75 m Height: 0.94 m
Weight (excluding driver)	139 kg
Driver weight	Minimum 80 kg (using added weights)
Number of wheels	3
Number of solarcells	1690 cells (Monocrystalline silicon solar cells)
Solarcells surface	6 m^{2} (maximum for silicon cells)
Efficiency solarcells	22%
Maximum speed	unknown
Engine	InWheel Direct Drive Electric Engine (Efficiency: 98%)
Battery	21 kg Lithium-ion battery
Body	Carbon fiber (textreme) with Twaron (aramidfibre) for parts that need extra driver protection / Titanium rollbar
Front wheel suspension	Double wishbone of carbon fibre / Metal springs which incorporate shocks / Carbon fiber shock absorber/ Aluminium rims / Ceramic bearings
Rear wheel suspension	Aluminium trailing arm with metal spring+shock absorber
Front brakes	Custom ceramic brakedisc / Aramid breaklines
Rear brakes	Regenerative brake
Tyres	(profiled tyres)
Rolling resistance	10 times less than an average car
Air resistance	12 times less than an average car
Telemetry	WiFi to support car

== See also ==
- Solar car racing
- List of solar car teams
