= Photovoltaic module analysis techniques =

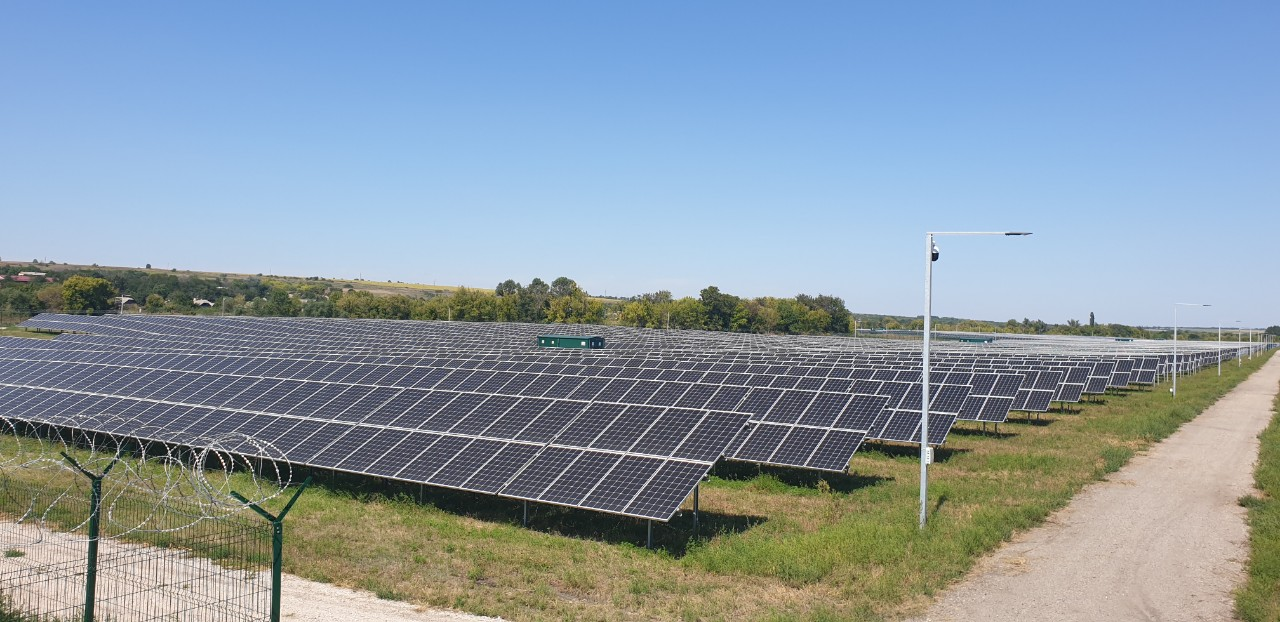
Typical photovoltaic power plant

Multiple different photovoltaic module analysis techniques are available and necessary for the inspection of photovoltaic (PV) modules, the detection of occurring degradation and the analysis of cell properties.

The analysis of PV modules during production and operation is an important part in ensuring reliability and thus energy efficiency of the PV technology. Therefore, it is crucial for solar module quality assurance.

During their lifetime, PV modules experience severe changes in weather and working conditions, leading to large temperature variations (day - night, summer - winter, irradiance) and mechanical stress (wind, snow, hail). This can lead to an enhanced degradation compared to the usual wearing-out of materials over time, resulting in degradation modes (DMs), which can have an (negative) effect on lifetime and power production. To predict the impact of DMs on a PV module or even a PV system, DM detection and evolution studies are needed. Several different analyses techniques are available, as each visualizes and analyzes different DMs and properties, therefore allows specific statements.

== Analysis techniques ==
Some DMs, like snailtracks or glass breakage, are visible by the naked eye. Others, like cell cracks and current mismatches in cells, can be visualized with luminescence techniques, while hot spots can be detected with infrared thermography. This article gives an overview about common analysis techniques used for operation and maintenance (O&M) of PV modules in the field.

=== Visual inspection ===
As it is the cheapest and fastest method, visual inspection is always first choice. It can be done during every inspection of the PV plant, but also more detailed, following a certain procedure. As visual inspection is subjective, evaluation forms are developed to ensure comparability.

Possible defects, which can be identified by visual inspection, are glass breakage, electro-chemical corrosion, burn marks (in front or back sheet), delamination of front glass or back sheet, browning (evoked by atmospheric oxygen or heating), snail tracks, soiling and others.

=== IV curve measurement ===
A current-voltage curve (IV curve) of a PV module gives information about the relation between current and voltage of the module and therefore about its quality and the solar cell efficiency. It might be distinguished between IV curve measurements in a laboratory under standard test conditions (STC) and a measurement outside in the field.

Measurements under standard test conditions (STC: 1000 W/m^{2}, 25 °C, air mass (AM) 1.5 radiation) show the specifications of a PV module and its quality and allows comparison with other modules measured under the same conditions. To assure STC, laboratory conditions and certain equipment are necessary. A solar simulator and a test bench are required: the module (or cell) is mounted in the test bench and then irradiated for a fraction of a second (so called "flashed"). During the flash, the voltage of the module is swept along a defined range and the resulting current is measured, resulting in the IV curve. Usually accuracies of about 3% can be expected for laboratory IV measurements.

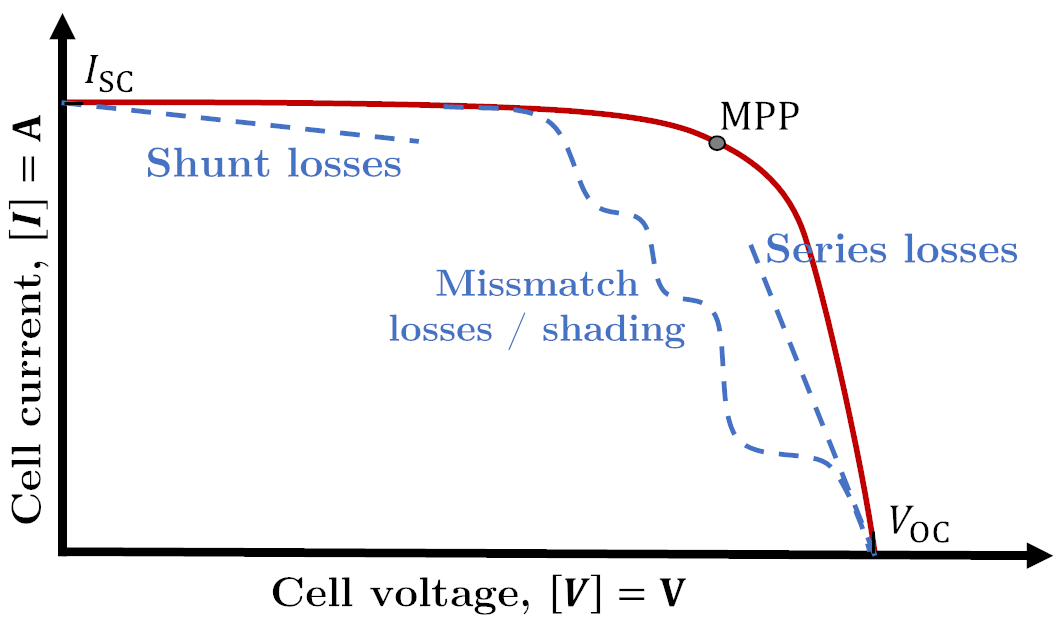
IV curve of a PV module and the effects provoked by series and shunt resistances and cell mismatches

For IV curve collection in the field one have to notice that irradiance and temperature are not controllable. Thus, to compare the resulting IV curve to ones taken in different conditions, it needs to be adapted to STC by correction factors for measured irradiance and cell temperature. A calibrated solar device can be used to measure the present sunlight irradiance and a temperature sensor (like a Pt100) to measure the cell temperature of the module under investigation. To measure the IV curve of a single module, portable devices, so called IV curve tracers, are available. Modern inverter or maximum power point tracker (MPPT) are able to measure the IV curve of the connected string (series circuit of multiple PV modules).

In a PV module under operation, the extreme conditions are open-circuit and short-circuit. At open-circuit, the voltage is maximum (open-circuit voltage V_{OC}) and the current zero. Whereas at short-circuit the current is maximum (short-circuit current, I_{SC}) and the voltage zero. The power is given by the product of current and voltage and has a maximum at maximum power point (MPP). One parameter to define the quality of a PV module is the fill factor (FF), which is the ratio between maximum power (P_{MPP}) of the module and the virtual power (P_{T}, product of V_{OC} and I_{SC}). All these values can be extracted from a measured IV curve. Furthermore, the IV curve allows to determine the shunt resistance (R_{SH}) and series resistance (R_{S}) of a PV module. The series resistance is the combined resistance of all materials and their transitions, created current has to overcome, to reach the load. An increased R_{S} results in less slope of the IV curve close to V_{OC}. The shunt resistance instead describes the separation strength of the p–n junction in the solar cell. A decrease in shunt resistance results in an increased slope of the IV curve close to I_{SC}. Electrical mismatches between the cells of a module result in a step wise behaviour of the IV curve. The same characteristic can occur from partially shading, which itself creates a mismatch.

=== Infrared thermography ===
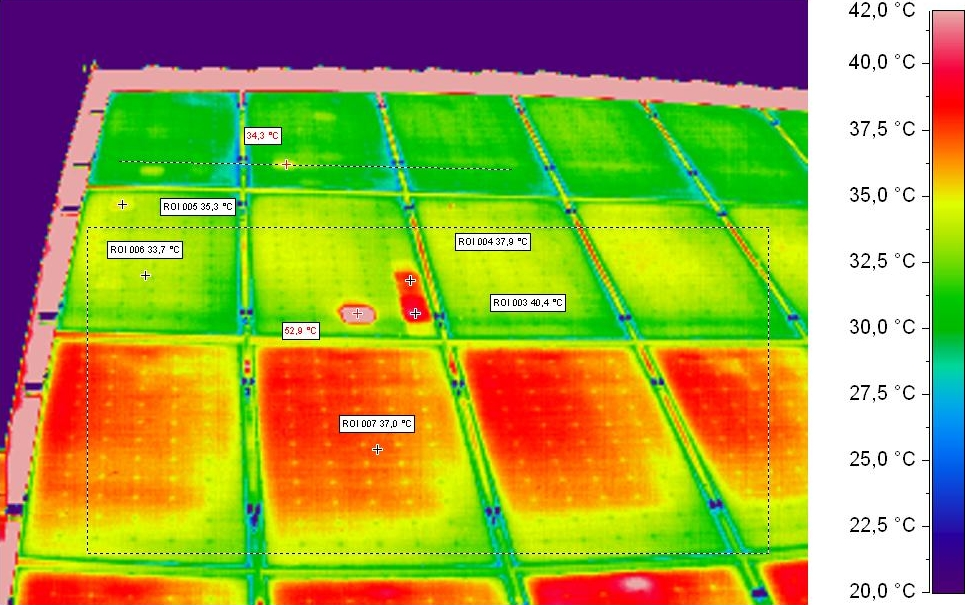
Thermography image of a PV module with hot spots in centered cell.

Some DMs lead to potential differences between the cells of a module or just parts of a single cell, which usually result in increased temperature, so called hot spots. An infrared (IR) camera allows to take an image of the module temperature with high spatial resolution, this is called thermography. Three different measurement methods are possible with thermography. The first one is called steady state thermography and can be done in the field. In laboratory conditions it is possible to perform pulse thermography and lock-in thermography, which can give a more detailed view of the PV module.

Steady state thermography is performed while the PV module is in normal operation and working under steady state conditions. It can be done on module level, as overview images of multiple modules or even on huge PV plant sections with unmanned aerial vehicles (drones). A cloudless day, irradiance of minimum 700 W/m^{2}, low ambient temperatures and low wind speed are preferred measuring conditions. As the infrared irradiance decreases with the distance, the image should be taken at an angle between min. 60° and best at 90° to module plane. Simultaneously any shadow on the module must be prevented (e.g. cast by clouds, buildings, operator or camera). Due to convective heat transfer variations of 3-5 K in a module are normal. Hot spots instead, are large local temperature differences of multiple 10 K. A hot spot can affect just a part of a cell in broken cells, affect whole cells for mismatches or even multiple cells, usually close to the module frame in case of potential-induced degradation (PID).

=== UV fluorescence ===
Ultraviolet fluorescence (UVF) is a common principle in different research fields. Exposing a material to ultraviolet (UV) light excites electrons of luminophores (more specific: fluorophores) in the material into higher energy states and emits photons with material-specific wavelengths by radiative recombination. These Photons can be seen by the naked eye, can be imaged with a camera or analysed with an UV/VIS spectrometer. To distinguish between excitation source and emitted signal, a bandwidth limited source (Light-emitting diode in UV regime) and a longpass filter can be used.

Luminophores are originally not present in a PV module. Due to long exposure to UV light during operation (after 80 kWh/m^{2}, equivalent to about one year in operation), they are created as decomposition products of molecules in the encapsulation of the module (usually Ethylene-vinyl acetate, EVA). Thus, UVF is useful to analyze the status of the EVA in a PV module, but only after a certain time. DMs in other materials of the module (glass, cells, back sheet) are not directly visible by UV fluorescence, but they can result in changes of the EVA which become visible. If Oxygen is part in the decomposition process, oxidization takes place and non fluorescent decomposition products are built. Oxygen can enter through the back sheet into the module and into the encapsulation. But only between cells and at cell cracks it is able to permeate through the slits into the front encapsulation where its reaction becomes visible. Thus, frames around the cells and tracks along cell cracks are visible in the UVF image through missing fluorescence signal.

While UVF imaging with a camera gives statements about the luminescence intensity and thus the fluorophore density, UVF spectroscopy analyses the kind of present fluorophores by measuring the emitted spectrum at a precise spot of the module. Therefore, it allows statements for example about the cell temperature history, as higher temperatures result in additional peaks in the measured spectrum. The measured UVF signal can be influenced by many reasons: e.g. the position on the module, the time a module is in operation, the actual temperature as well as the temperature history of the module, the experienced doses of heat, humidity and UV light and other.

=== Luminescence ===
In luminescence imagery, carriers inside the diode of the PV-module solar-cells are excited and luminescence radiation is emitted due to radiative recombination. The wavelength of the emitted photons is determined by the band gap energy of the cell material, which are photons in the short-wave infrared (SWIR) regime at 1140 nm for Silicon. As the luminescence signal is created by the solar cell material, it gives an insight to the cell material status and therefore allows the detection of DMs like cell cracks, PID, and statements about material properties like series resistance. The signal can be collected with a camera, whose sensor is sensitive in the SWIR regime. For excitation of the solar cells, two different approaches are commonly used: Electroluminescence and Photoluminescence.

==== Electroluminescence ====
For electroluminescence (EL) imaging, excitation of the Silicon is triggered by an external forward current, applied to the module connectors by a power supply. The emerging forward bias forces majority carrier to cross the p–n junction, resulting in increased recombination. This method corresponds to the working principle of light emitting diodes (LEDs).

Usually, EL is done in laboratory conditions, where a dark environment ensures separation of emitted and surrounding radiation. But also outdoor EL under low light conditions is practicable. To get rid of any noise (in laboratory noise due to electronics and statistical fluctuations of the emitted photons, outdoor additionally the ambient radiation) in the collected signal, background subtraction of the EL image is done. Therefore, an identical image with power supply off is taken, which consists only of the noise and can be subtracted from the initial image. EL imagery allows detection of many DMs like cell cracks, cell mismatches, finger disruptions, PID and others.

==== Photoluminescence ====
Photoluminescence (PL) imaging is done by use of an external light source to excite carrier inside the Silicon of the solar cells. If no circuit is applied or the load on the module is high enough, the excited carrier have no way to leave the solar cell and will recombine, resulting in luminescence radiation. The light source should have a narrow spectrum, like a LED or a homogenized diode laser, to allow easy separation of its own light to the luminescence signal. Additionally, separation can be assured by a long-pass or even a band-pass filter. In laboratory conditions the same rules like for EL apply and background subtraction should be performed. A new approach uses the daylight as exciting source (outdoor daylight photoluminescence), which results in even less necessary equipment.

The advantage of PL over EL is, that no electrical connection to the module is necessary. Therefore, PL can be performed during the whole production cycle of solar cells (EL only if connectors are mounted) and PV modules in operation can stay connected to the grid, whereas for EL they have to be disconnected and the external power supply attached. additionally to the DMs detectable with EL, PL can measure the minority carrier lifetime in the cell material, the diffusion length and the diode voltage.
