= Potential-induced degradation =

In crystalline photovoltaic modules

Potential-induced degradation (PID) is a potential-induced performance degradation in crystalline photovoltaic modules, caused by so-called stray currents. This effect may cause power loss of up to 30 percent.

The cause of the harmful leakage currents, besides the structure of the solar cell, is the voltage of the individual photovoltaic (PV) modules to the ground. In most ungrounded PV systems, the PV modules with a positive or negative voltage to the ground are exposed to PID. PID occurs mostly at negative voltage with respect to the ground potential and is accelerated by high system voltages, high temperatures, and high humidity.

== History ==
The term "potential-induced degradation" (PID) was first introduced in the English language in a published study by S. Pingel and coworkers in 2010. It was introduced as a degradation mode resulting from voltage potential between the cells in the photovoltaic module and ground. Research in this field was pioneered by the Jet Propulsion Laboratory, focusing primarily on electrochemical degradation in crystalline silicon and amorphous silicon photovoltaic modules. The degradation mechanism known as polarization found in the first generation crystalline silicon high performance modules from SunPower in strings having positive voltage potential with respect to ground was discussed in 2005. Degradation of conventional front junction (n+/p) solar cell modules under voltage potential was also observed. The degradation by polarization was also covered in the trade journal Photon (4/2006, 6/2006, and 4/2007).

In 2007, PID was reported in a number of solar panels from Evergreen Solar (Photon 1/2008 and 8 /2008). In this case, the degradation mechanism occurring in photovoltaic modules containing the more common front junction (n+/p) crystalline silicon solar cells when the modules were in negative voltage potential with respect to ground. PID was further discussed as a problem in ordinary crystalline modules (Photon 12/2010, lecture by solar energy company Solon SE at PVSEC in Valencia 2010). Statement of the solar module manufacturer Solon SE: "At 1000 V, a now quite common voltage for larger PV systems, it can be critical for each module technology". PID of the shunting type (PID-s), which is the most prevalent and most detrimental type of PID for crystalline silicon modules, was discovered to be caused by microscopic crystal defects penetrating the p-n front junction of affected solar cells.

In 2013, only 4 major manufacturers according to ISE Fraunhofer of the existing 23 modules are considered to be not affected by the PID.

== Detection ==
Although, PID usually has no visual effect on the module, different photovoltaic module analysis techniques are available for detection and analysis. First, the power degradation can become visible in IV curves. infrared thermography and luminescence imaging techniques like electroluminescence and photoluminescence are also able to detect PID.

== Prevention ==
The PID-s that occurs in modules in negative polarity strings can be completely prevented if an inverter is used with the possibility of grounding (or effectively grounding) the positive or negative pole. This is possible if the inverter is galvanically isolated, e.g. using a transformer, if specially designed transformerless inverter topologies are used, or by altering the electric grid potential to ground. Which pole must be grounded, is clarified with the solar module manufacturer. The easiest and very effective method to prevent PID is to install a reversal device from the first day of installation. See Anti-PID manufacturers in the "Reversal" section below.

The phenomenon does not affect photovoltaic installations with micro-inverters, as the voltages are too low to facilitate Potential Induced Degradation.
