= Nuna 2 =

2003 Dutch solar-powered racing car model

Nuna 2 is the name of a solar powered vehicle that in 2003 won the World solar challenge in Australia for the second time in a row, after the Nuna 1 victory in 2001. The Nuna solar racers are built by students who are part of the Nuon Solar Team at the Delft University of Technology.

== Facts about Nuna 2 ==
Length: 5 m
Width: 1.8 m
Weight: 300 kg
Top speed: 170 km/h

To reach a speed of 100 km/h requires 1650 W, equivalent to the power used by a hair drier

The body was made from carbon fibre, reinforced with Aramid.

=== Solar cells ===
Nuna 2 used three-layered triple-junction gallium-arsenide solar cells developed by the European Space Agency through its Technology Research Programme. The first spacecraft to use this new type of solar cell was SMART-1 launched September 2003.

The efficiency of the three-layered triple-junction gallium-arsenide solar cells was above 24.5%.

Nuna 2 was fitted with 3000 solar cells mounted on the top and the sides of the car. The solar array was covering a total area of 9 square metres (97 sq ft), which is 1 square metre (11 sq ft) more than on the Nuna 1.

=== Batteries ===
A total of 46 lithium ion (Li-ion) battery cells were connected in series to supply 5 kWh (18 MJ) of electrical energy.

These highly efficient batteries were originally developed for space applications where reliability is essential. The same batteries providing power to Nuna II during cloudy weather are also used by SMART-1

== World solar challenge ==
Nuna 2 won the race in 31.05 hours averaging a speed of 97.02 km/h for the 3021 km course breaking the course record of the previous Nuna 1 solar racer.
