= Hot spot (photovoltaics) =

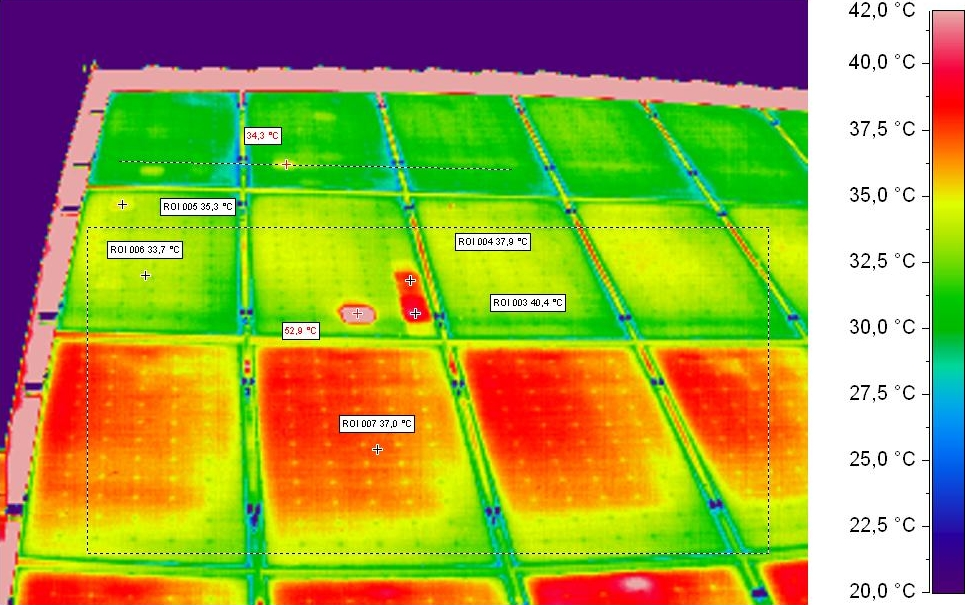
Thermography image of a PV module with visible hot spot in centered cell.

In a photovoltaic (PV) module, a hot spot describes an over proportional heating of a single solar cell or a cell part compared to the surrounding cells. It is a typical degradation mode in PV modules.

== Origin ==
Hot spots can origin, if one solar cell, or just a part of it, produces less carrier compared to the other cells connected in series. This may occur due to partially shading, dirt on the module (leaf, bird drop) or cell mismatches. The less producing part is only able to pass current corresponding to its own amount of carrier. Additional carrier, produced in the other cells, accumulate at the cell edges, which leads to a reversed bias of the affected cell. Thus, it works like a resistor and the voltage drop is transferred into heat.

== Detection and prevention ==
Quick detection is possible with infrared camera, performing thermography imaging. A hot spot can also lead to browning in the glass plane of the PV module, if it is present for long time. Thus, the hot spot can become visible for the human eye.

To prevent emergence of hot spots, the different causes have to be considered. Cell mismatches are prevented by measuring the maximum power point of produced cells and then combining similar cells into one module. To ensure a homogeneous irradiation on the module, shadow-casting structures are considered and avoided during PV plant construction. And to avoid severe damage from dirt, periodic cleaning is necessary. Finally, bypass diodes are integrated in PV modules to shortcut a cell string, if the voltage drop becomes too high.
