= World Solar Challenge 1987 =

Trans-Australian car race

1987 Pentax World Solar Challenge
- The 1st edition of the World Solar Challenge
- Host Country: Australia
- Dates run: 1987
- Start: Darwin, Australia
- Finish: Adelaide, Australia
- Total Distance (km): 3,028

Results
- Winner: (United States) General Motors
- 2nd: Ford Australia
- 3rd: (Switzerland) Biel College of Engineering

The 1987 World Solar Challenge was the first international solar-powered car race held in Australia. It covered about 3,000 km (1,900 mi) through the Australian Outback, from Darwin, Northern Territory to Adelaide, South Australia.

The race included 23 teams and was won by a team from General Motors with the car 'Sunraycer' ahead of entries from Ford Australia and Biel College of Engineering. The race included a time deadline. Of the 23 entrants, six completed the full course, with others' completion points were noted in order at their location at the time of the race end time. A few teams chose to continue to Adelaide afterwards, with one team from Japan completing the course in a month.

== Route ==
The World Solar Challenge runs across approximately 3,000 km from Darwin, the capital of the Northern Territory, to Adelaide, the capital of South Australia.

== Results ==
Rank	Team	Car	Country	Time (hr:mn)	Speed (km/h)
1	General Motors	Sunraycer	USA	44:90	66.90
2	Ford Australia	Sunchaser	Australia	67:53	44.48
3	Biel College of Engineering	Spirit of Biel	Switzerland	69:97	42.98
4	Australian Geographic	Marsupial	Australia	81:43	36.89
5	Darwin Institute of Technology	Desert Rose	Australia	95:45	31.47
6	Chisholm Institute of Technology	Desert Cat	Australia	98:20	30.59

The balance of the 23 cars, including teams from the Solar Resource Syndicate (Australia), Massachusetts Institute of Technology Solectria, Alarus, Chariot of the Sun (Denmark), Hoxan Corporation, Morphett Vale High School and Semiconductor Energy Lab finished in-place on the course at the end of the race time, where their location was recorded in order. After the race ended several teams continued on to the course finish in Adelaide, including a team from Japan who took one month to finish the course.
