= Nuna 3 =

2005 Dutch solar-powered racing car model

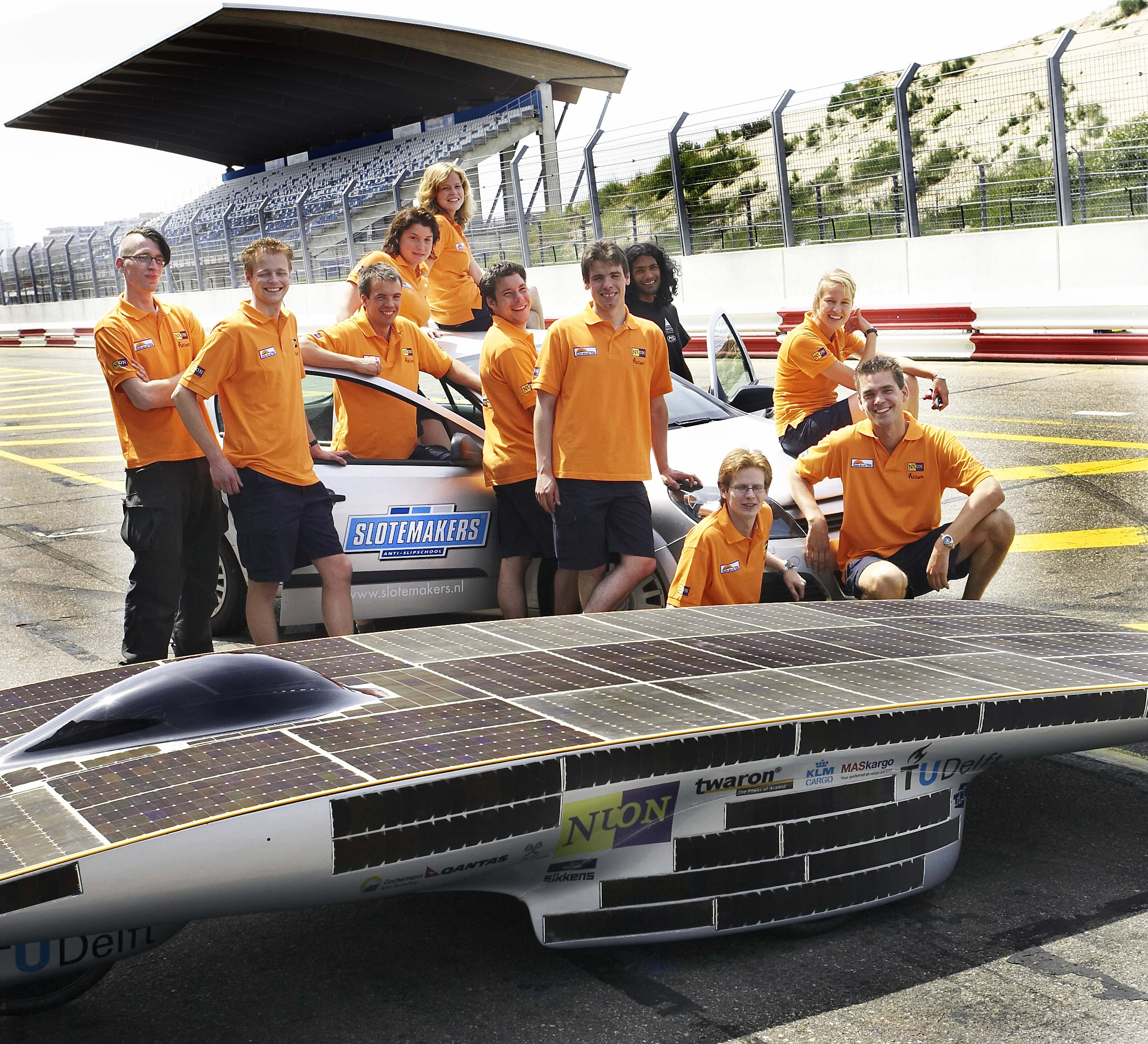
The team at the race course of Zandvoort

The Nuna 3 is a solar car developed by Nuon Solar Team form the Delft University of Technology in 2004-2005 for the 2005 World Solar Challenge.

It succeeded the Nuna2, the solar car that scored a second consecutive win for this solar team by winning the World Solar Challenge for the third time in a row.

Nuna 3 was one of the favourites for the 2005 edition of the World Solar Challenge with a pre-race test-drive recorded top speed of 130 km/h. The final result was that the 3021 kilometers between Darwin and Adelaide were covered in a record 29 hours and 11 minutes, averaging about 103 km/h.

It has very efficient solar cells of a type normally used to power orbital satellites (as had the previous Nunas), and it has better aerodynamics and is lighter than its predecessors.

It was designed and built by 11 students from different disciplines of the Delft University of Technology, who have partly put their studies on hold for this. They used the high-tech labs and workshops of the University and, as with the Nuna 2, they received advice from Wubbo Ockels, the first Dutch astronaut and professor at the University.

== Main specifications ==
Dimensions	5 × 1.8 × 0.8 m	(l × w × h)
Weight	< 200 kg
Air friction coefficient	0.07	this value is between 0.25 and 0.35 for modern cars
Solar cell efficiency	$\approx$ 27%	this is a very high efficiency; for comparison the most efficient solar cells yet created under laboratory conditions were only 14% more efficient than this. The material used to fabricate these cells was a compound containing gallium arsenide. The efficiency of most panels is 15%
Effective solar cell area	> 8m^2	including the solar cells attached to the sides of the car
Motor efficiency	> 97%	comparison: an average electromotor has an efficiency of 85%
Battery capacity	5 kWh	comparison: an ordinary 24 kg car battery has a capacity of 80 Ah, which equals 1 kWh
Battery weight	30 kg	comparison: an ordinary 24 kg car battery has a capacity of 80 Ah, which equals 1 kWh

== Design criteria ==
To have a good chance to win, the car has to:

- collect as much solar energy as possible
- use as little energy as possible to drive at a certain speed. This means special attention to:
  - the efficiency of transferring electrical energy to the wheels, and
  - minimizing friction, constituted by:
    - air friction (air resistance), and
    - rolling friction, which in turn is affected by the weight, among other things

== Solar cells ==
The solar cells are made of gallium arsenide (GaAs) and consist of three layers. Sunlight that penetrates the upper layer is used in the lower layers, resulting in an efficiency of over 26%. This type of solar cell is among the best available currently. Apart from efficiency, size also matters, so the entire upper surface of the Nuna 3 is covered with them, except for the cockpit.

Efficiency is optimal when the cells are hit by the solar rays perpendicularly. If not, output is reduced by roughly the cosine of the angle with the perpendicular. Because the 2005 race was held in September (as opposed to October or November in previous years) the sun was lower in the sky (it is earlier in spring). To compensate for this, as many cells as possible were placed at the sides, most notably on the wheel caps.

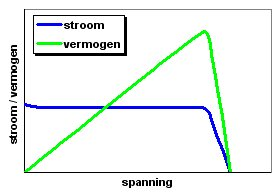
VI characteristic of a solar cell

A solar cell gives a certain amount of current for a certain amount of sunlight. The voltage depends on the load (more precisely the resistance of the load). The power is the product of voltage and current and therefore also depends on the load. Over a certain voltage the current of the solar cell quickly drops to zero, as the graph illustrates.

However, the batteries have a fairly constant voltage, which also has a rather different value than that of the solar cells. So a voltage transformation is needed. A special type of DC-DC converter is used to ensure the load resistance presented to the solar cells is such that the solar cells give maximum power, so also at the top of the green line in the graph. This is called a Maximum power point tracker (MPPT). Here too, the goal is to have this conversion achieve maximum efficiency (>97%).

== Aerodynamic design ==
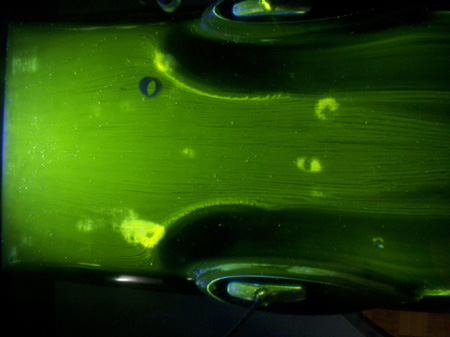
The underside of the Nuna 3 model in a wind tunnel

The aerodynamic drag is an important part of the total resistance. Important are the frontal surface and the streamline. Any deviation from the ideal streamline will cause turbulence, which costs energy. The ideal streamline is achieved in various stages:

1. Through computer simulations of the design
2. Through testing of a scale model in a wind tunnel. For example, liquid paints can be applied to see the flow of air over the surface. The photo shows is taken during one of those tests in the Low Speed Laboratory of the TU Delft.
3. Through testing of the full scale car in a wind tunnel. For this a German-Dutch wind tunnel in Emmeloord will be used.

From meteorological data from the area where the contest is to take place, it can be concluded that there will likely be a strong side-wind. The wheel caps of the Nuna 3 are designed such that a sidewind will have a propulsory effect.

== Motor ==
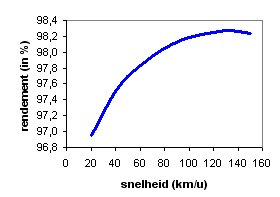
Efficiency of the Biel engine

The electromotor is totally encased in the rear wheel to minimise loss through mechanical transmission from motor to wheel (such as in a normal car in the gear box and cardan). The motor is an improved version of the original 1993 Motor of the Spirit of Biel III by the Engineering School of Biel, Switzerland (now: Berner Fachhochschule Technik und Informatik). The improvements are due to completely redeveloped digital power electronics and control, realized 1999. They allowed for 50% more power (over 2400 W) and a 45% higher torque compared to the 1993 Spirit of Biel II. The efficiency of the total drive system (including the power electronics losses) is also improved and is now over 98%. But as the graph shows this depends somewhat on the speed and increases with speed. The design was initially made to reach its maximum performance at the normal cruising speed of the solar car at around 100 km/h.

== Test drive ==
During one of the test drives in the Netherlands the Nuna 3 achieved a speed of 130 km/h. On the first day of the race the car achieved a top speed of 140 km/h. For comparison, the Sunraycer (the first winner of the Solar Challenge race) attained a top speed of 109 km/h in 1987.

== Important opponents ==
The winner of the North American Solar Challenge from the University of Michigan (USA) was considered to be one of the most important opponents. Other important contestants were the MIT (also USA) and the Japanese Ashiya University team. In 2005 there were also two other European contestants, the Dutch Raedthuys Solar Team from the University of Twente and the Belgian Umicore Solar Team from Leuven.

== 2005 race monitor ==
- 5 August 2005: the team arrives in Adelaide.
- 2 September 2005: The road permit is granted.
- 16 September 2005: During a test drive Nuna 3 strands in the rough next to the road. A defective wheel suspension turned out to be the cause. The damage was limited and repaired after a few days.
- 22 September 2005: The Nuna 3 is approved by the organisation.
- 24 September 2005: The Nuna 3 qualifies for the 8th starting position, which is better than the starting positions the previous two models got.
- 25 September 2005: The Nuna 3 covered 827 km holding first place, leading the next-placed Michigan team by approximately half an hour.
- 26 September 2005: On the second day the Nuna 3 covered 835 km, at an average speed of 105 km/h, which is a new single-day record for the World Solar Challenge. The Michigan team is now 132 km behind.
- 27 September 2005: Nuna 3 covered 858 km, beating yesterdays record. They extended their lead to two hours. 500 km to go.
- 28 September 2005: Nuna 3 arrives as first car in Adelaide, thus scoring a hat-trick. The overall average speed of 103 km/h over 3,010 km means an improvement by 6 km/h of the 2003 record.

This average speed, which could lead to maximum speeds of 140 km/h speeds on downhill section, well exceeding speed limits on the Australian highway, has led to rules changes for future races.
