= Sunraycer =

1987 American solar-powered racing car built by GM

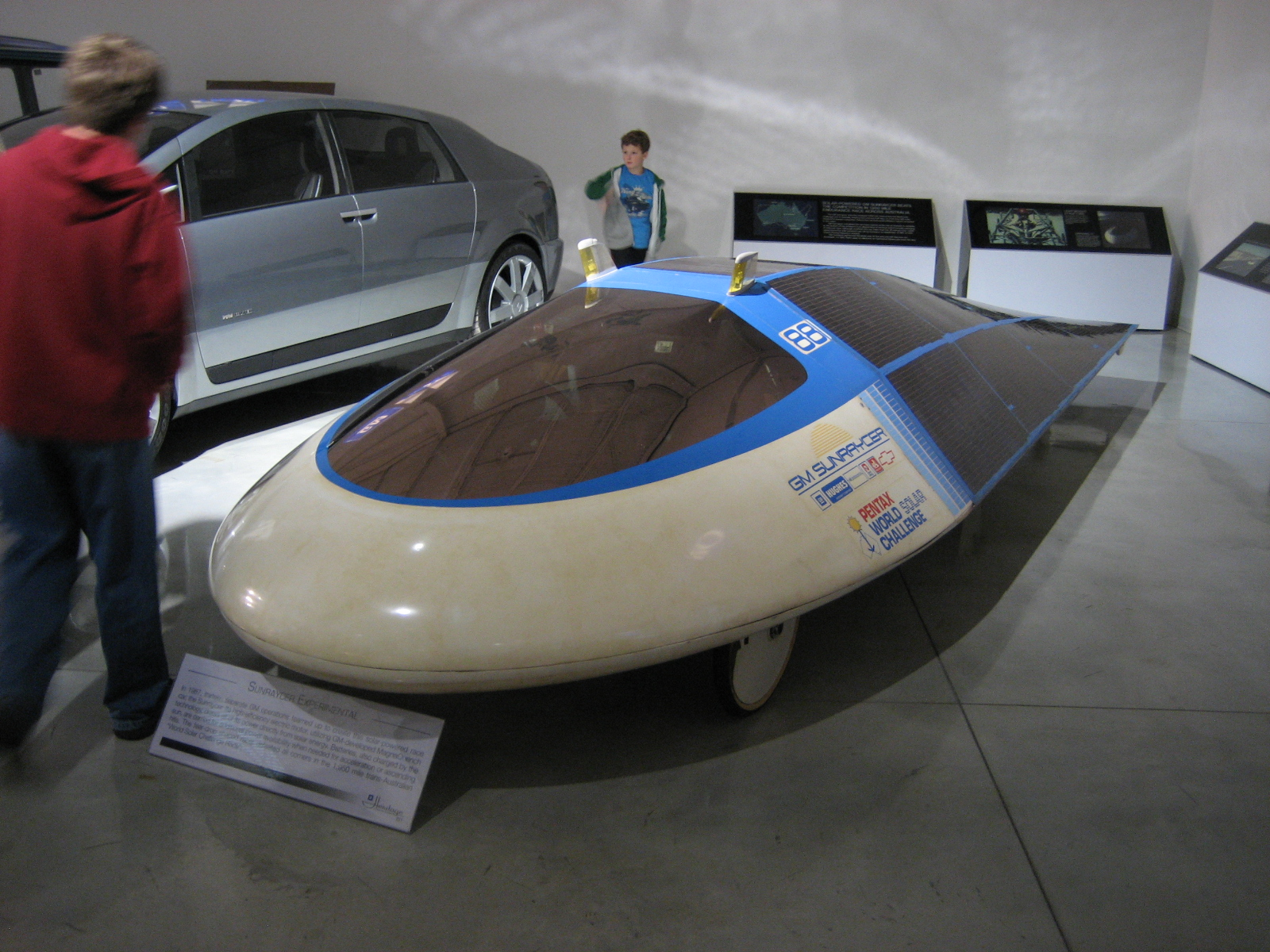

Overview
- Manufacturer: General Motors, AeroVironment and Hughes Aircraft
- Production: 1987

Powertrain
- Electric motor: 6-pole, exterior permanent magnet, 25 Nm
- Power output: 1500 W
- Battery: 30 AH, Silver zinc battery

Dimensions
- Length: 6 m (20 ft)
- Width: 2 m (6.6 ft)
- Height: 1 m (3.3 ft)

The Sunraycer is a solar-powered racing car built in 1987 through a joint collaboration between General Motors, AeroVironment, and Hughes Aircraft to compete in the inaugural 1987 World Solar Challenge, the first transcontinental race featuring solar-powered vehicles. Driven primarily by Australian racing driver John Harvey, the Sunraycer won the 1,950-mile (3,140 km) 1987 inaugural race from Darwin to Adelaide by more than two days over the second-place entrant. The car is now part of the collection of the Smithsonian Institution's National Museum of American History.

According to AeroVironment engineer and Caltech alumnus Dr. Alec Brooks, Harvey was involved with the testing and development of the Sunraycer at the General Motors Proving Ground in Arizona, by request of General Motors Holden's Australian arm.

== Background ==
The World Solar Challenge originated with Australian adventurer Hans Tholstrup, who with engineer Larry Perkins drove a solar-powered vehicle across Australia from Perth to Sydney in 1983, and who subsequently organized the first transcontinental race for solar cars. In late 1986, GM executive Roger Smith received a copy of the race rules and forwarded them to Hughes Aircraft, recently acquired by GM. Hughes vice president Howard Wilson proposed entering the race and, through Hughes technology director Ed Ellion, connected with Paul MacCready, founder of AeroVironment. With less than 10 months remaining before the race's November 1, 1987 start, AeroVironment took on the project, and GM funded the effort through Hughes which eventually became known as SunRaycer.

== Design and development ==
AeroVironment, led by MacCready with engineer Dr. Alec Brooks heading the design effort, prioritized low weight and low aerodynamic drag (an ultra-low wind resistance vehicle). The finished vehicle weighed approximately 390 lb (177 kg) and achieved a drag coefficient of 0.125-0.13, with a top speed of 68 mph (109 km/h).

A total of 8800 solar cells were manufactured and installed by a team from Hughes Aircraft. At high noon, the car would generate about 1500 watts of power.

The engine was created for the Sunraycer by GM using a brand new electric motor based on Magnequench permanent magnets. This kind of rare-earth magnet was invented in 1983 independently by the GM physics department and Sumitomo Special Metals. Both companies discovered and eventually commercialized two significantly different manufacturing processes for this material class; the GM concept was commercialized under the Magnequench brand. The new motor was lightweight and efficient; GM stated its motor efficiency was around 92%. In 2011 its constructor won the IEEE Nikola Tesla Award.

Aside from the driver, the single heaviest element in the car was the Hughes battery pack that utilized silver-oxide batteries. These batteries were included to provide extra power when passing trucks, to smooth out the performance of the vehicle, and because the race rules mandated driving only between the hours of 8 AM to 5 PM, but the cars were allowed to charge their batteries from sunlight even when they were not on the road, allowing driving during allowed hours even when the weather was overcast.

The frame of the car weighed 14 pounds. AeroVironment engineers made use of Kevlar for the shell of the car. The Sunraycer was tested through the spring and summer of 1987. During the testing period, the team had the time to set a new world speed record with the Sunraycer, achieving a speed of 36 mph (58 km/h) from solar power alone, breaking the old record by 10 mph.

The Sunraycer reportedly cost slightly less than $2 million to build.

== Race ==
The race, in November 1987, was from Darwin in the north of Australia, to Adelaide in the south. The race course followed the Stuart Highway for nearly the entire trip, going past Alice Springs in the middle of the continent.

The Sunraycer, driven by John Harvey, won the pole position with the fastest speed of all the 24 contestants (109 km/h), remaining in first place for the entire race. It raced the 1,867 miles (3,005 km) with an average speed of 41.6 mph (66.9 km/h), finishing the race in just 5.2 days. This was 50% faster than the second place vehicle (which arrived in Adelaide two days after the Sunraycer). Roger Smith, the GM CEO, went to Adelaide to congratulate his winning team.

In June, 1988, at Mesa, Arizona, the Sunraycer broke the solar powered speed record with a top speed of 75.276 mph (121.145 km/h). By comparison, the winning car in the 2005 World Solar Challenge was the Nuna 3, which had a top speed of 140 km/h (87 mph) and cruised with speeds of 110 to 120 km/h (av. speed 103 km/h for entire 3000 km). This record held until it was broken by UNSW Sunswift in January 2011.

== Post-race and legacy ==
GM put the Sunraycer on tour, where it was displayed at several events across the United States. GM also produced a promotional 30-minute film about the Sunraycer aimed at middle-school and high-school students, narrated by one of the drivers of the Sunraycer. GM then donated the Sunraycer to the Smithsonian Institution.

The Sunraycer led directly to the creation of the GM Impact, an electric powered car also designed by AeroVironment with help from both GM and Hughes; though the Sunraycer used solar power and not electrical power, it was not considered feasible at the time to create a solar-powered car for the American car market. The GM Impact led to the GM EV-1, an experimental electric car which was leased to customers for a few years in the late 1990s before being controversially retired and scrapped.

== See also ==
- The Quiet Achiever
- Nuna

== Bibliography ==
- Racing with the sun Popular Science November 1987 PP.84
- Marshall, Jeff. "Racing with the sun." The Science Teacher 71.1 (2004): 40.
