= Nuna 1 =

2001 Dutch solar-powered racing car model

Nuna 1 (or simply Nuna) was a car powered by solar power, developed by students from the Delft University of Technology.

The first Nuna team (the so-called Alpha Centauri team) consisted of the following team members: Ramon Martinez, Kim de Lange, Eiso Vaandrager, Bart Goorden, Bram Soethoudt, Koen Boorsma, Anne Makenbach, Rosalie Puiman and Eric Trottemant. The project was sponsored by Nuon. Thanks to this financial help the team was able to finish their first car: Nuna 1. The team consisted mainly of students from the Delft University of Technology who were guided by former astronaut Wubbo Ockels.

The Nuna won the World Solar Challenge in Australia in 2001; the race ran from Darwin in the north to Adelaide in the south. It was the first time that the Dutch team participated in the race. The 3021 km long race was finished in 32 hours and 39 minutes, breaking the old record by the Honda team from 1996 (33 hours and 32 minutes). The average speed was 91.8 kilometer per hour.

== Solar cells ==
The car's shell was covered with the best dual-junction and triple-junction gallium-arsenide solar cells, developed for satellites. These cells had an efficiency of about 24%. The European Space Agency (ESA) was about to test these cells in space in early 2003, when the technology-demonstrating SMART-1 mission was scheduled to launch to the Moon.

Solar cell from Hubble space telescope on Nuna solar racer

A small strip of silicon solar cells on the side of the car was very special for a different reason: the communication equipment was powered by a strip of cells that originally belonged to the NASA/ESA Hubble Space Telescope. These cells were part of a large solar array, retrieved by ESA astronaut Claude Nicollier and brought back to Earth in 1993 with a Space Shuttle. They have been donated to the Alpha Centauri team as a special mascot.

== Race ==
- Nuna qualified 11th
- 18 November 2001 - Day 1
  - Nuna took the lead before the first checkpoint in the race
  - End of day 1: Nuna is in the lead. 728 km in distance has been covered
- 19 November 2001 - Day 2
  - Nuna slowed down in strong wind saving energy
  - Australian aurora team overtook Nuna and build a 30 km lead
  - Around 16:00, Aurora was once again in sight and Nuna re-took the lead.
  - End of day 2: Nuna had a lead of 12.6 km over Aurora. M-Pulse lay in third place at 58 km and Solar Motions in fourth at 91 km.
- 20 November 2001 - Day 3
  - Nuna vehicle maintained the lead in the race to reach Adelaide.
  - End of day 3: Having travelled a total distance of 2100 km, the finish line was just 830 km away. The closest rival car, Aurora, is just 15 km behind Nuna, although third-placed M-Pulse is now trailing by more than an hour.
- 21 November 2001 - Day 4
  - Nuna finished first in a record-breaking time of 32 hours 39 minutes.

== See also ==
- Solar car racing
- Solar vehicle
- List of solar car teams
