= Nuna 4 =

2007 Dutch solar-powered racing car model

The Nuna 4 is a solar car developed by the Delft University of Technology in 2006-2007 for the 2007 World Solar Challenge.

It succeeded the Nuna 3, the solar car that scored a hat trick by winning the World Solar Challenge for the third time in a row. The Nuna4 also won the 2007 World Solar Challenge with an average speed of 90.87 km/h (56.46 mph) ahead of the Belgian Umicore and Australian Aurora teams, making its fourth consecutive win.

The Nuna4 measures 472 x 168 x 110 cm and weighs less than 190 kg (without driver). Its main innovation is its very light construction.

== Technical specifications ==
Technical stats on Nuna 4
| Measurements | Length: 4.72 m Width: 1.68 m Height: 1.10 m |
| Weight (excluding driver) | 202 kg |
| Number of wheels | 3 |
| Number of solarcells | 2318 cells (Gallium-Arsenide Triple Junction) |
| Solarcells surface | 6 m² (new 2007 rules maximum) |
| Efficiency solarcells | > 26% |
| Maximum speed | At least 142 km/h (88 mph) |
| Engine | InWheel Direct Drive Electric Engine (Efficiency: 97 – 99%) |
| Battery | 30 kg Lithium-ion polymer battery |
| Body | Carbon fiber and Twaron (aramidfibre)/ Integrated composite rollcage |
| Front wheel suspension | Double wishbone of carbon fibre with aluminium / Carbon fiber shock absorber |
| Rear wheel suspension | Horizontal fork of carbon fiber / Aluminium connectionpoints |
| Tyres | Michelin Solar Radial 16 inch (slicks) |
| Rolling resistance | 10 times less than an average car |
| Air resistance | 6 times less than an average car |
| Number plate | ZZ-78-61 |

== Changes to previous version ==
Because of risks involved with the high speeds reached by the solar cars in the previous races (Nuna3 averaged over 102 km/h (63 mph)) and tighter speed limits on the Australian roads the rules were changed for the 2007 race to enhance safety and reduce speed.

These changes are

- Nuna4 solar panel is smaller, measuring 6m2 instead of 9m2. This means that it is slower and much smaller than its predecessor.
- The driver sits almost upright. In previous Nuna cars the driver was lying down.
- The driver is protected not only by a tough canopy, but also by roll bars and a helmet.
- Nuna4 has a steering wheel. Previous versions were steered by levers.
- Nuna4 is higher. That makes it frontal surface area rather bigger, but the consequences of that are partially offset by even better aerodynamics.

== Adaptive cruise control ==
Nuna4 is equipped with a GPS-tracking system. Its data is transferred via a WiFi connection to a support vehicle. A computer in the support vehicle calculates the optimum speed based on the data from the car and additional information including wind speed and direction, the gradient of the road, solar conditions and the state of the batteries. This speed is sent wireless to the Nuna4 cruise control. The car accelerates or decelerates accordingly. The driver only has to steer whilst driving using this adaptive cruise control system.

== See also ==
- Nuna main article about the Nuna series of Dutch solar cars
- Twente One a challenging Dutch solar car, which succeeded the SolUTra.
- List of solar car teams
- World Solar Challenge
