= SolUTra =

Solar car

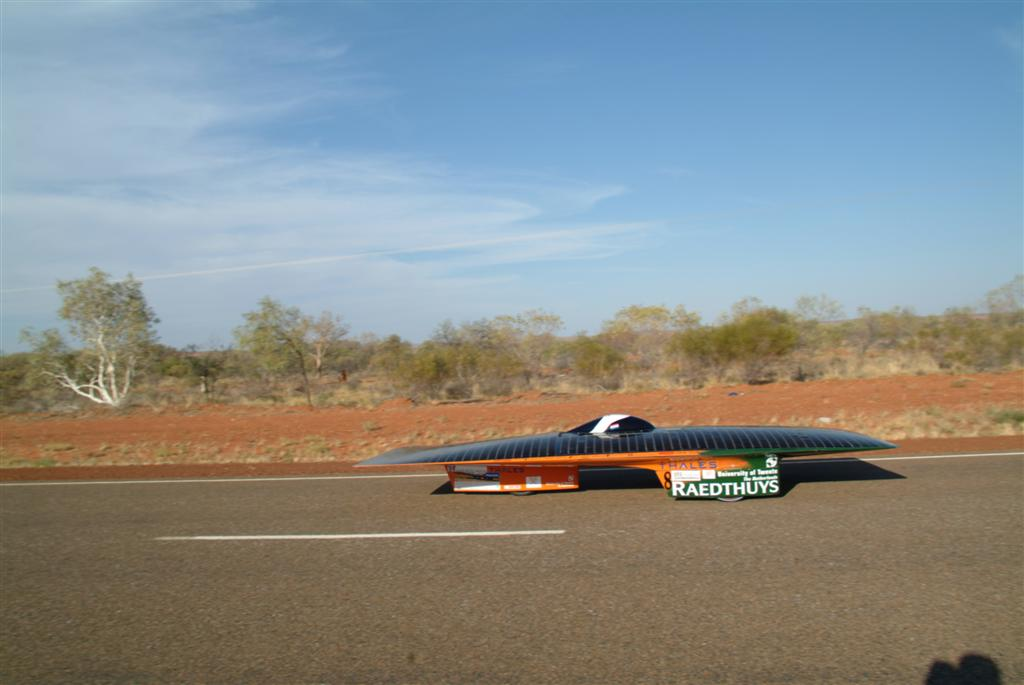
Photo: Raedthuys Group - The SolUTra during the Panasonic World Solar Challenge 2005 in Australia

The Solutra is the first solar car designed by a group of students, the Raedthuys Solar Team, of the University of Twente. It participated in the 8th World Solar Challenge in 2005 and finished 9th place. Another Dutch team won the race with their car Nuna 3.

This solar car is the current FIA world record holder on the 1 km with a flying start. This record has been set on August 28, 2005, at the Gronausestraat in Enschede, The Netherlands.

== Specifications ==
Length	4999mm
Width	1799mm
Height	800mm
Vehicle Weight	210 kg
Drag coefficient	0,08 CdA
Panel efficiency	24,5%
Battery capacity	5.5kWh
Top speed	125 km/h
1000 km average	85 km/h

== See also ==
- The Twente One TU car which succeeded the Solutra
- The Nuna 4 another Dutch solar car that won the 2007 World Solar Challenge.
- The main article about the Nuna series of Dutch solar cars.
- List of solar car teams
