= Timeline of solar cells =

Part of the history of energy and technology

In the 19th century, it was observed that the sunlight striking certain materials generates detectable electric current – the photoelectric effect. This discovery laid the foundation for solar cells. Solar cells have gone on to be used in many applications. They have historically been used in situations where electrical power from the grid was unavailable.

As the invention was brought out it made solar cells as a prominent utilization for power generation for satellites. Satellites orbit the Earth, thus making solar cells a prominent source for power generation through the sunlight falling on them. Solar cells are commonly used in satellites in today's times.

== 1800s ==
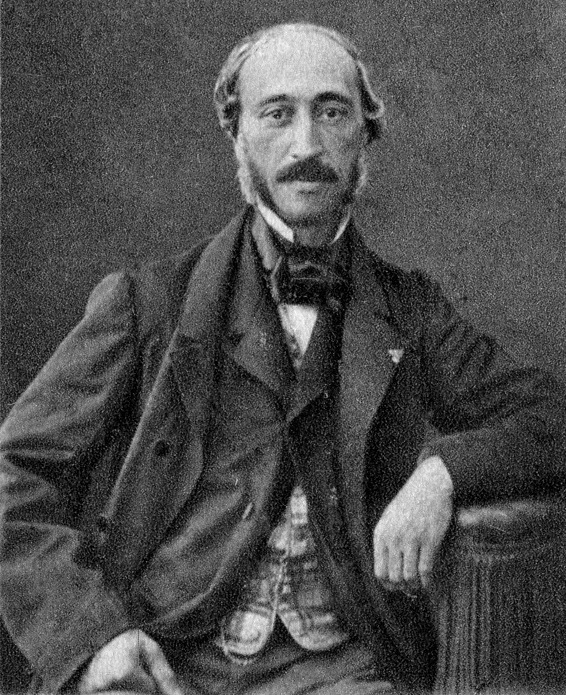
Edmond Becquerel created the world's first photovoltaic cell at 19 years old in 1839.

- 1839 - Edmond Becquerel observes the photovoltaic effect via an electrode in a conductive solution exposed to light.
- 1873 - Willoughby Smith finds that selenium shows photoconductivity.
- 1874 - James Clerk Maxwell writes to fellow mathematician Peter Tait of his observation that light affects the conductivity of selenium.
- 1877 - William Grylls Adams and Richard Evans Day observed the photovoltaic effect in solidified selenium, and published a paper on the selenium cell. 'The action of light on selenium,' in "Proceedings of the Royal Society, A25, 113.
- 1883 - Charles Fritts develops a solar cell using selenium on a thin layer of gold to form a device giving less than 1% efficiency.
- 1887 - Heinrich Hertz investigates ultraviolet light photoconductivity and discovers the photoelectric effect
- 1887 - James Moser reports dye sensitized photoelectrochemical cell.
- 1888 - Edward Weston receives patent US389124, "Solar cell," and US389125, "Solar cell."
- 1888–91 - Aleksandr Stoletov creates the first solar cell based on the outer photoelectric effect
- 1894 - Melvin Severy receives patent US527377, "Solar cell," and US527379, "Solar cell."
- 1897 - Harry Reagan receives patent US588177, "Solar cell."
- 1899 - Weston Bowser receives patent US598177, "Solar storage."

== 1900–1929 ==
- 1901 - Philipp von Lenard observes the variation in electron energy with light frequency.
- 1904 - Wilhelm Hallwachs makes a semiconductor-junction solar cell (copper and copper oxide).

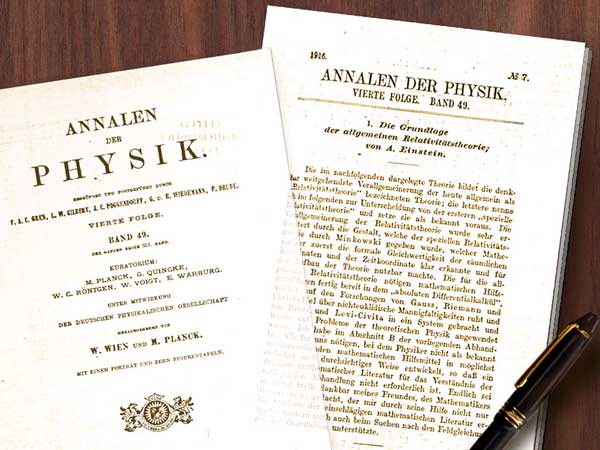
Einstein's "On a Heuristic Viewpoint Concerning the Production and Transformation of Light" was published in Annalen der Physik in 1905.

- 1904 - George Cove develops a solar electric generator.
- 1905 - Albert Einstein publishes a paper explaining the photoelectric effect on a quantum basis.
- 1913 - William Coblentz receives patent US1077219, "Solar cell."
- 1914 - Sven Ason Berglund patents "methods of increasing the capacity of photosensitive cells."
- 1916 - Robert Millikan conducts experiments and proves the photoelectric effect.
- 1918 - Jan Czochralski produces a method to grow single crystals of metal. Decades later, the method is adapted to produce single-crystal silicon.
- 1921 - Einstein awarded the Nobel Prize in Physics for his work on the photoelectric effect.

== 1930–1959 ==
- 1932 - Audobert and Stora discover the photovoltaic effect in Cadmium selenide (CdSe), a photovoltaic material still used today.
- 1935 - Anthony H. Lamb receives patent US2000642, "Photoelectric device."
- 1946 - Russell Ohl files patent US2402662, "Light sensitive device."
- 1948 - Gordon Teal and John Little adapt the Czochralski method of crystal growth to produce single-crystalline germanium and, later, silicon.
- 1950s - Bell Labs produce solar cells for space activities.
- 1953 - Gerald Pearson begins research into lithium-silicon photovoltaic cells.
- 1954 - On April 25, 1954, Bell Labs announces the invention of the first practical silicon solar cell. Shortly afterwards, they are shown at the National Academy of Sciences Meeting. These cells have about 6% efficiency. The New York Times forecasts that solar cells will eventually lead to a source of "limitless energy of the sun".
- 1955 - Western Electric licences commercial solar cell technologies. Hoffman Electronics-Semiconductor Division creates a 2% efficient commercial solar cell for $25/cell or $1,785/watt.
- 1956 - RCA Joseph J. Loferski published a highly-cited paper titled "Theoretical Considerations Governing the Choice of the Optimum Semiconductor for Photovoltaic Solar Energy Conversion"
- 1957 - AT&T assignors (Gerald L. Pearson, Daryl M. Chapin, and Calvin S. Fuller) receive patent US2780765, "Solar Energy Converting Apparatus." They refer to it as the "solar battery". Hoffman Electronics creates an 8% efficient solar cell.
- 1957 – Mohamed M. Atalla develops the process of silicon surface passivation by thermal oxidation at Bell Laboratories. The surface passivation process has since been critical to solar cell efficiency.

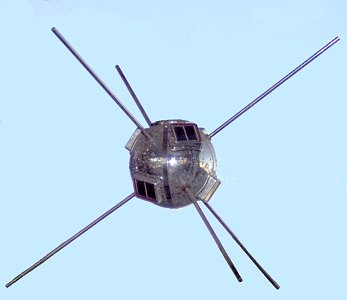
Vanguard 1 with its six solar cells attached

- 1958 -Hoffman Electronics creates 9% efficient solar cells. Vanguard I, the first solar-powered satellite, was launched with a 0.1 W, 100 cm^{2} solar panel., Japan's Mount Shinobuyama station is the world's first instance of solar power being chosen as a permanent, practical, and economically justified solution for civilian infrastructure.
- 1959 - Hoffman Electronics creates a 10% efficient commercial solar cell, and introduces the use of a grid contact, reducing the cell's resistance.

== 1960–1979 ==
- 1960 - Hoffman Electronics creates a 14% efficient solar cell. Prior researchers had noted the theoretical radiation advantages of n-on-p material under laboratory conditions, early attempts to build the cells resulted in poor electrical efficiency. Joseph Mandelkorn,U. S. Army Signal Research and Development Laboratory. ,developed low-temperature phosphorus diffusion, and succeeded in making the radiation-resistant n-on-p silicon solar cell 10% efficient, and as practical and easily manufactured as the standard commercial p-on-n cell." ----.
- 1961 - "Solar Energy in the Developing World" conference is held by the United Nations.
- 1962 - The Telstar communications satellite is powered by solar cells.
- 1963 - Sharp Corporation produces a viable photovoltaic module of silicon solar cells.
- 1964 - The satellite Nimbus I is equipped with Sun-tracking solar panels.
- 1964 - Farrington Daniels' landmark book, Direct Use of the Sun's Energy, published by Yale University Press.
- 1967 - Soyuz 1 is the first crewed spacecraft to be powered by solar cells
- 1967 - Akira Fujishima discovers the Honda-Fujishima effect which is used for hydrolysis in the photoelectrochemical cell.
- 1968 - Roger Riehl introduces the first solar-powered wristwatch.
- 1970 - First highly effective GaAs heterostructure solar cells are created by Zhores Alferov and his team in the USSR.
- 1971 - Salyut 1 is powered by solar cells.
- 1973 - Skylab is powered by solar cells.
- 1974 - Florida Solar Energy Center begins.

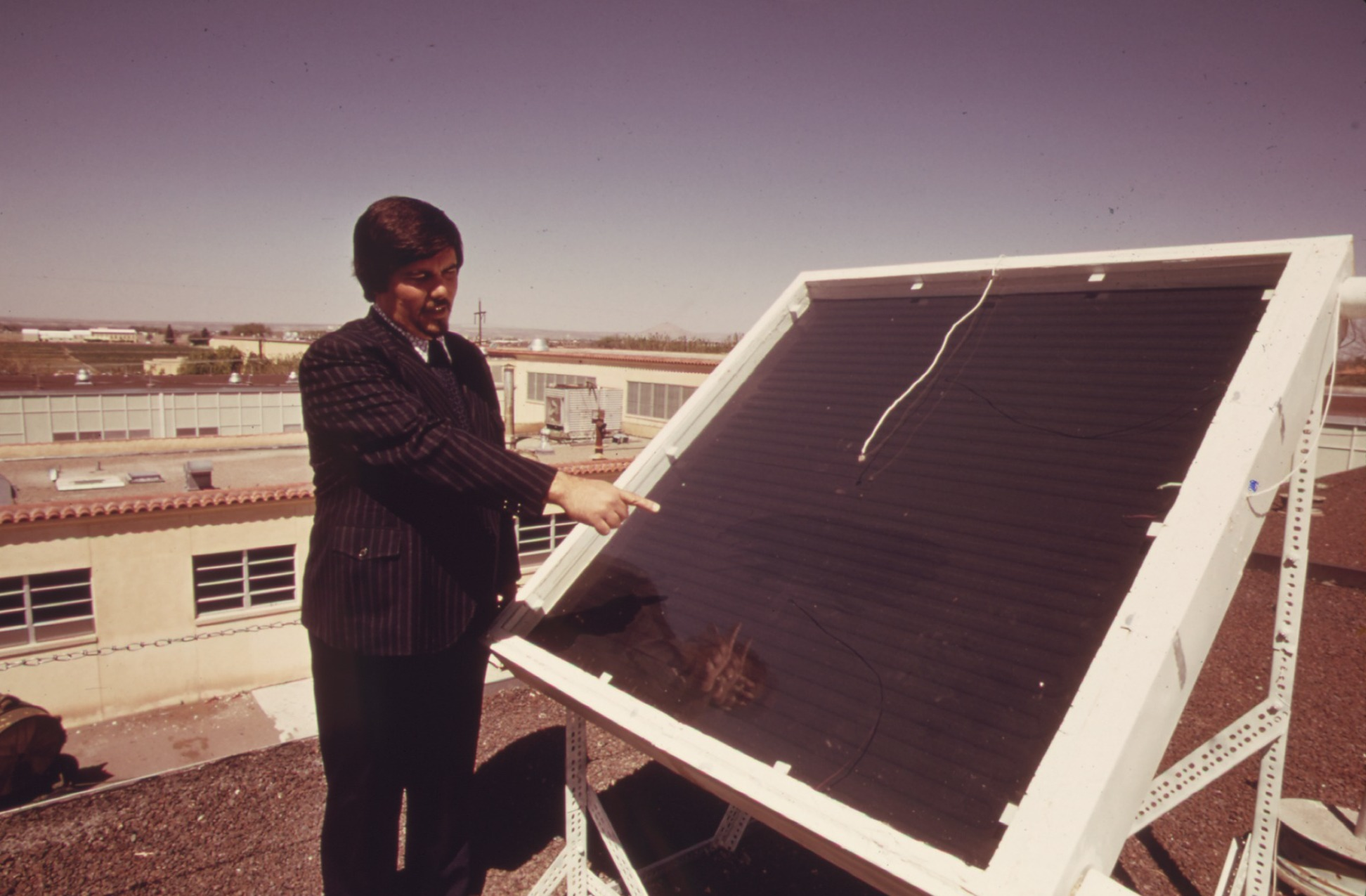
A New Mexico State University professor showing a solar panel in New Mexico in April 1974

- 1974 - J. Baldwin, at Integrated Living Systems, co-develops the world's first building (in New Mexico) heated and otherwise powered by solar and wind power exclusively.
- 1976 - David E. Carlson and Christopher Wronski of RCA Laboratories create first amorphous silicon PV cells, which have an efficiency of 2.4%.
- 1977 - The Solar Energy Research Institute is established at Golden, Colorado.
- 1977 - The world production of photovoltaic cells exceeded 500 kW
- 1978 - First solar-powered calculators.
- Late 1970s: the "Energy Crisis"; groundswell of public interest in solar energy use: photovoltaic and active and passive solar, including in architecture and off-grid buildings and home sites.

== 1980–1999 ==
- 1980 - The Institute of Energy Conversion at University of Delaware develops the first thin-film solar cell exceeding 10% efficiency using Cu_{2}S/CdS technology.
- 1981 - Fraunhofer Institute for Solar Energy Systems ISE is founded by Adolf Goetzberger in Freiburg, Germany.
- 1981 - Isofoton is the first company to mass-produce bifacial solar cells based on developments by Antonio Luque et al. at the Institute of Solar Energy in Madrid.
- 1982 - The first >10% amorphous silicon thin-film solar cell is reported.
- 1983 - Worldwide photovoltaic production exceeds 21.3 megawatts, and sales exceed $250 million.
- 1984 - 30,000 SF Building-Integrated Photovoltaic [BI-PV] Roof completed for the Intercultural Center of Georgetown University. Eileen M. Smith, M.Arch. took 20th Anniversary Journey by Horseback for Peace and Photovoltaics in 2004 from solar roof to Ground Zero NY World Trade Center to educate public about BI-PV Solar Architecture. Array was still generating an average of one MWh daily as it has since 1984 in the dense urban environment of Washington, DC.
- 1985 - 20% efficient silicon cells are created by the Centre for Photovoltaic Engineering at the University of New South Wales.
- 1986 - 'Solar-Voltaic DomeTM' patented by Lt. Colonel Richard T. Headrick of Irvine, California, as an efficient architectural configuration for building-integrated photovoltaics [BI-PV]; Hesperia, California field array.
- 1988 - The Dye-sensitized solar cell is created by Michael Grätzel and Brian O'Regan. These photoelectrochemical cells work from an organic dye compound inside the cell and cost half as much as silicon solar cells.
- 1988–1991 AMOCO/Enron used Solarex patents to sue ARCO Solar out of the business of a-Si (see Solarex Corp.(Enron/Amoco) v.Arco Solar, Inc.Ddel, 805 Fsupp 252 Fed Digest.)
- 1989 - Reflective solar concentrators are first used with solar cells.
- 1990 - The Magdeburg Cathedral installs solar cells on the roof, marking the first installation on a church in East Germany.
- 1991 - Efficient photoelectrochemical cells are developed

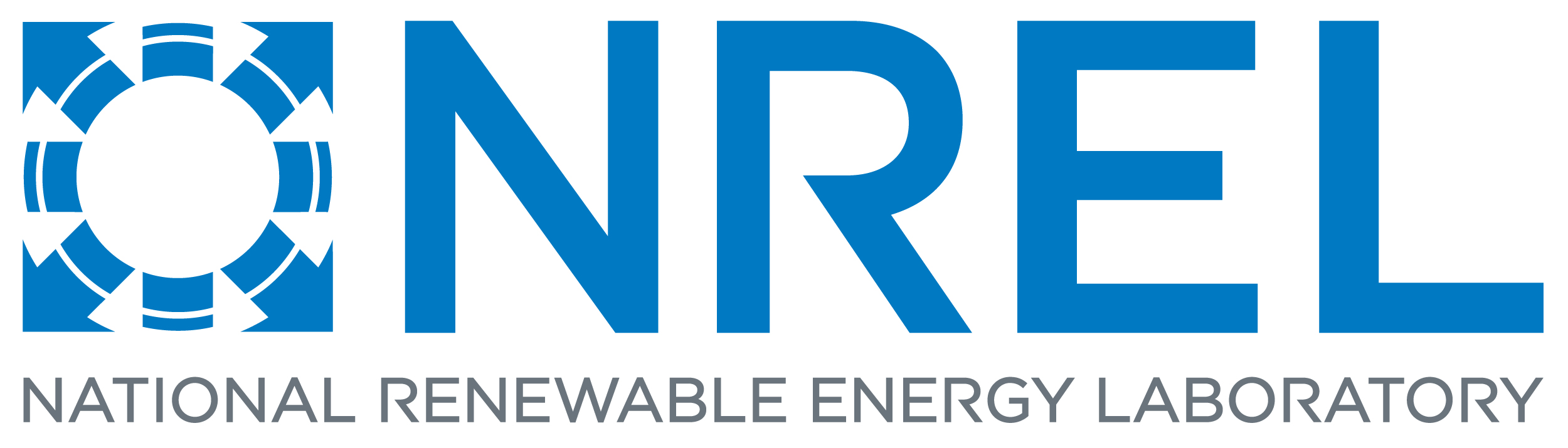
National Renewable Energy Laboratory logo

- 1991 - President George H. W. Bush directs the U.S. Department of Energy to establish the National Renewable Energy Laboratory (transferring the existing Solar Energy Research Institute).
- 1992 - The PV Pioneer Program started at Sacramento Municipal Utility District (SMUD). It was the first broad based commercialization of distributed, grid-connected PV system ("roof-top solar") It became the model for the later CA Million Solar Roofs Program.
- 1992 - University of South Florida fabricates a 15.89% efficient thin-film cell.
- 1993 - The National Renewable Energy Laboratory's (NREL) Solar Energy Research Facility is established.
- 1994 - NREL develops a GaInP/GaAs two-terminal concentrator cell (180 suns) which becomes the first solar cell to exceed 30% conversion efficiency.
- 1996 - The National Center for Photovoltaics is established. Graetzel, École Polytechnique Fédérale de Lausanne, Lausanne, Switzerland achieves 11% efficient energy conversion with dye-sensitized cells that use a photoelectrochemical effect.
- 1999 - Total worldwide installed photovoltaic power reaches 1,000 megawatts.

== 2000–2019 ==
Exponential growth-curve on a semi-log scale of worldwide installed photovoltaics in gigawatts since 1992

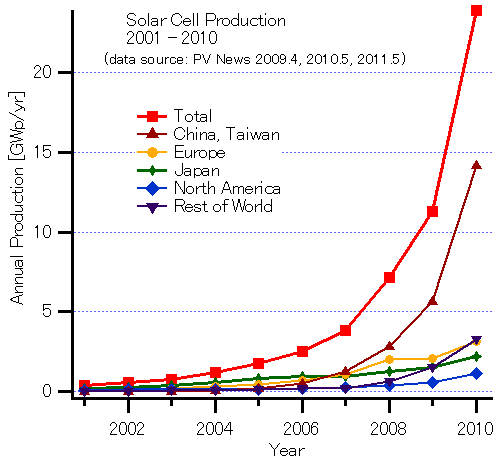
Solar cell production by region 2000–2010

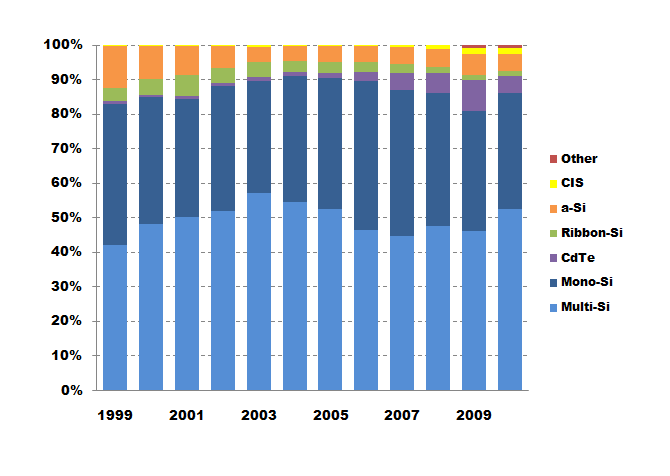
Market share of the different PV technologies 1999–2010

- 2003 - George Bush has a 9 kW PV system and a solar thermal systems installed on grounds keeping building at the White House
- 2004 - California Governor Arnold Schwarzenegger proposed Solar Roofs Initiative for one million solar roofs in California by 2017.
- 2004 - Kansas Governor Kathleen Sebelius issued a mandate for 1,000 MWp renewable electricity in Kansas by 2015 per Executive Order 04-05.
- 2006 - Polysilicon use in photovoltaics exceeds all other polysilicon use for the first time.
- 2006 - California Public Utilities Commission approved the California Solar Initiative (CSI), a comprehensive $2.8 billion program that provides incentives toward solar development over 11 years.
- 2006 - New World Record Achieved in Solar Cell Technology - New Solar Cell Breaks the "40 Percent Efficient" Sunlight-to-Electricity Barrier.
- 2007 - Construction of Nellis Solar Power Plant, a 15 MW PPA installation.
- 2007 - The Vatican announced that in order to conserve Earth's resources they would be installing solar panels on some buildings, in "a comprehensive energy project that will pay for itself in a few years."
- 2007 - University of Delaware claims to achieve new world record in Solar Cell Technology without independent confirmation: 42.8% efficiency.
- 2007 - Nanosolar ships the first commercial printed CIGS, claiming that they will eventually ship for less than $1/watt. However, the company does not publicly disclose the technical specifications or current selling price of the modules.
- 2008 - New record achieved in solar cell efficiency. Scientists at the U.S. Department of Energy's National Renewable Energy Laboratory (NREL) have set a world record in solar cell efficiency with a photovoltaic device that converts 40.8% of the light that hits it into electricity. However, it was only under the concentrated energy of 326 suns that this was achieved. The inverted metamorphic triple-junction solar cell was designed, fabricated and independently measured at NREL.
- 2010 - IKAROS becomes the first spacecraft to successfully demonstrate solar sail technology in interplanetary space.
- 2010 - US President Barack Obama orders installation of additional solar panels and a solar water heater at the White House
- 2011 - Fast-growing factories in China push manufacturing costs down to about $1.25 per watt for silicon photovoltaic modules. Installations double worldwide.
- 2013 - After three years, the solar panels ordered by President Barack Obama were installed on the White House.

Worldwide installed photovoltaic capacity in "watts per capita" by country. Estimated figures for year 2016.

- 2016 - University of New South Wales engineers established a new world record for unfocused sunlight conversion to electricity with an efficiency increase to 34.5% . The record was set by UNSW's Australian Centre for Advanced Photovoltaics (ACAP) using a 28 cm^{2} four-junction mini-module – embedded in a prism – that extracts the maximum energy from sunlight. It does this by splitting the incoming rays into four bands, using a four-junction receiver to squeeze even more electricity from each beam of sunlight.
- 2016 - First Solar says it has converted 22.1 percent of the energy in sunlight into electricity using experimental cells made from cadmium telluride—a technology that today represents around 5 percent of the worldwide solar power market.
- 2018 - Alta Devices, a US-based specialty gallium arsenide (GaAs) PV manufacturer, claimed to have achieved a solar cell conversion efficiency record of 29.1%, as certified by Germany's Fraunhofer ISE CalLab.
- 2018 - The first dedicated solar panel recycling plant in Europe and "possibly in the world" is opened in France.
- 2019 - The world record for solar cell efficiency at 47.1% was achieved by using multi-junction concentrator solar cells, developed at National Renewable Energy Laboratory, Golden, Colorado, USA. This is above the standard rating of 37% for polycrystalline photovoltaic or thin-film solar cells as of 2018. It was reported in a study published in 2020.

Reported timeline of research solar cell energy conversion efficiencies since 1976 (National Renewable Energy Laboratory)

== 2020s ==
=== 2020 ===
- Solar cell efficiency of perovskite solar cells have increased from 3.8% in 2009 to 25.2% in 2020 in single-junction architectures, and, in silicon-based tandem cells, to 29.1%, exceeding the maximum efficiency achieved in single-junction silicon solar cells.
- 6 March – Scientists show that adding a layer of perovskite crystals on top of textured or planar silicon to create a tandem solar cell enhances its performance up to a power conversion efficiency of 26%. This could be a low cost way to increase efficiency of solar cells.
- 13 July – The first global assessment into promising approaches of solar photovoltaic modules recycling is published. Scientists recommend "research and development to reduce recycling costs and environmental impacts compared to disposal while maximizing material recovery" as well as facilitation and use of techno–economic analyses.
- 3 July – Scientists show that adding an organic-based ionic solid into perovskites can result in substantial improvement in solar cell performance and stability. The study also reveals a complex degradation route that is responsible for failures in aged perovskite solar cells. The understanding could help the future development of photovoltaic technologies with industrially relevant longevity.

=== 2021 ===
- 12 April – Scientists develop a prototype and design rules for both-sides-contacted silicon solar cells with conversion efficiencies of 26% and above, Earth's highest for this type of solar cell.
- 7 May – Researchers address a key problem of perovskite solar cells by increasing their stability and long-term reliability with a form of "molecular glue".
- 21 May – The first industrial commercial production line of perovskite solar panels, using an inkjet printing procedure, is launched in Poland.
- 13 December – Researchers report the development of a database and analysis tool about perovskite solar cells which systematically integrates over 15,000 publications, in particular device-data about over 42,400 of such photovoltaic devices.
- 16 December – ML System from Jasionka, Poland, opens first quantum glass production line. The factory started the production of windows integrating a transparent quantum-dots layer that can produce electricity while also capable of cooling buildings.

=== 2022 ===
- 30 May - A team at Fraunhofer ISE led by Frank Dimroth developed a 4-junction solar cell with an efficiency of 47.6% - a new world record for solar energy conversion.
- 13 July – Researchers report the development of semitransparent solar cells that are as large as windows, after team members achieved record efficiency with high transparency in 2020. On 4 July, researchers report the fabrication of solar cells with a record average visible transparency of 79%, being nearly invisible.
- 9 December – Researchers report the development of 3D-printed flexible paper-thin organic photovoltaics.
- 19 December – A new world record solar cell efficiency for a silicon-perovskite tandem solar cell is achieved, with a German team of scientists converting 32.5% of sunlight into electrical energy.

2023

In 2023, researchers at the Helmholtz-Zentrum Berlin (HZB) achieved a certified 32.5% power conversion efficiency for a tandem perovskite-silicon solar cell, certified by the European Solar Test Installation (ESTI). Subsequent lab iterations at Longi Solar and King Abdullah University of Science and Technology (KAUST) further pushed certified two-terminal tandem efficiencies above 33.7%, confirming perovskite tandems as viable commercial successors to standard crystalline silicon.Science Journal Publication: Interface engineering for high-efficiency perovskite/silicon tandem solar cells, Science (2023)

=== 2024 ===
- 12 March – Scientists demonstrate the first monolithically integrated tandem solar cell using selenium as the photoabsorbing layer in the top cell, and silicon as the photoabsorbing layer in the bottom cell.

=== 2025 ===
- 1 June - Quantum Dot Solar Cells: enhanced efficiency and lower production costs.

== See also ==
- Energy development
- History of wind power
- List of energy topics
- List of solar energy topics
- Financial incentives for photovoltaics
- Smart grid#Research
- Timeline of materials technology
- Timeline of hydrogen technologies
- Timeline of sustainable energy research 2020–present
- List of years in science
