= Solar power =

Conversion of energy from sunlight into electricity

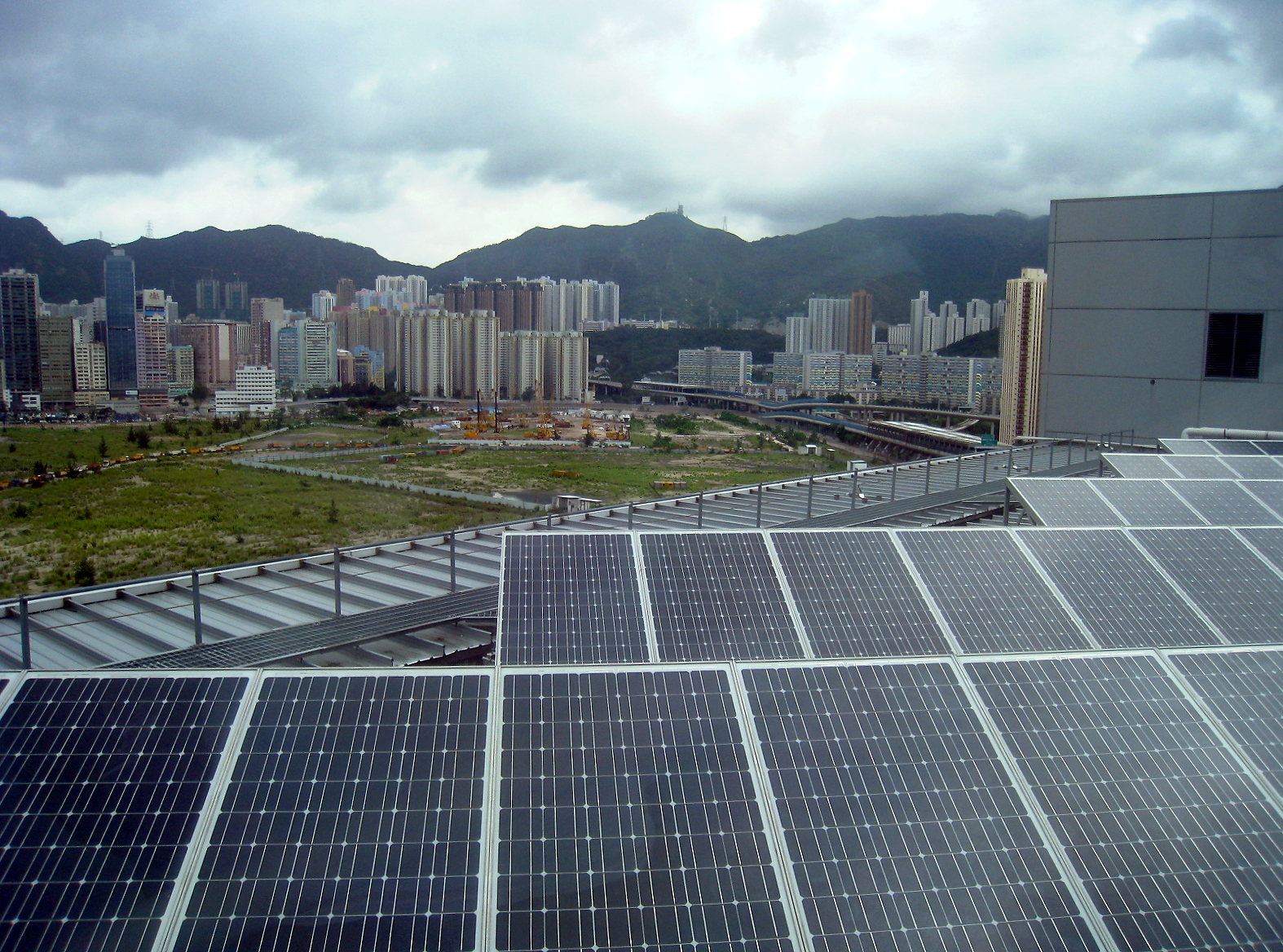
Rooftop solar in Hong Kong

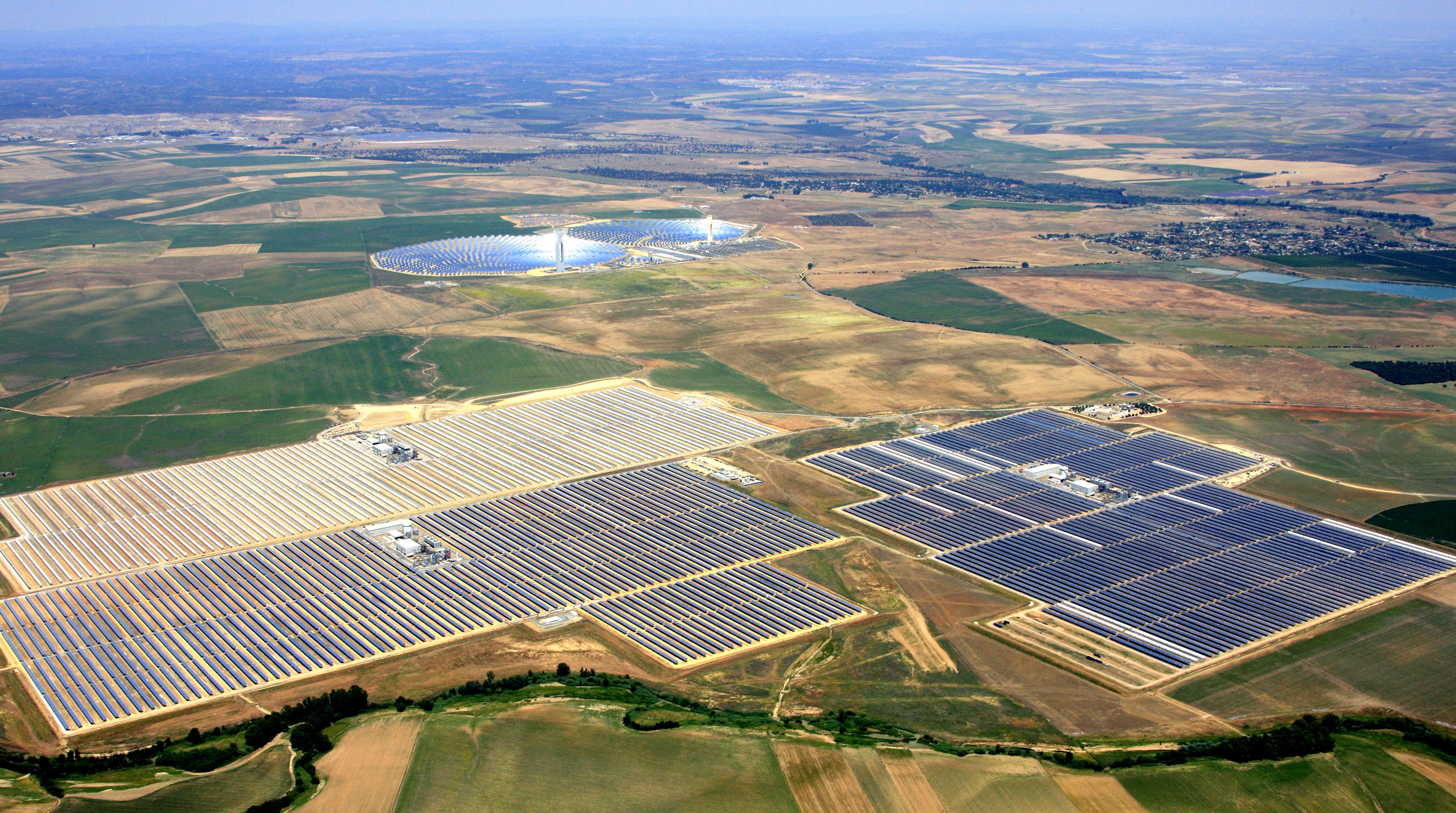
The first three concentrated solar power (CSP) units of Spain's Solnova Solar Power Station in the foreground, with the PS10 and PS20 solar power towers in the background

Solar power, also known as solar electricity, is the conversion of energy from sunlight into electricity, either directly using photovoltaics (PV) or indirectly using concentrated solar power. Solar panels use the photovoltaic effect to convert light into an electric current. Concentrated solar power systems use lenses or mirrors and solar tracking systems to focus a large area of sunlight to a hot spot, often to drive a steam turbine.

Photovoltaics (PV) were initially solely used as a source of electricity for small and medium-sized applications, from the calculator powered by a single solar cell to remote homes powered by an off-grid rooftop PV system. Commercial concentrated solar power plants were first developed in the 1980s. Since then, as the cost of solar panels has fallen, grid-connected solar PV systems' capacity and production have doubled about every three years. Three-quarters of new generation capacity is solar, with both millions of rooftop installations and gigawatt-scale photovoltaic power stations continuing to be built.

In 2025, solar power generated 9% of global electricity. In 2024, solar generated 7% of global electricity and over 1% of primary energy (2.7% by the substitution method), adding twice as much new electricity as coal. Along with onshore wind power, utility-scale solar is the source with the cheapest levelised cost of electricity for new installations in most countries. Almost half the solar power installed in 2022 was mounted on rooftops. China is currently the largest producer and installer of solar power capacity; globally, it produces 98% of solar wafers, 92% of solar cells and 85% of solar panels, and accounted for more than 55% of global installed solar capacity in the first half of 2025.

Much more low-carbon power is needed for electrification and to limit climate change. The International Energy Agency said in 2022 that more effort was needed for grid integration and the mitigation of policy, regulation and financing challenges. Nevertheless solar may greatly cut the cost of energy. Solar is important for energy security.

== Potential ==
Geography affects solar energy potential because some places are sunnier than others. In particular areas that are closer to the equator generally receive more sunshine. However, solar panels that can follow the position of the Sun can significantly increase the solar energy potential in areas that are farther from the equator. Daytime cloud cover can reduce the light available for solar cells.

Land availability also has a significant effect on the potential for solar energy deployment. Despite prices of solar panels have dropped significantly in recent years, a major limitation for many countries to adopt large scale solar deployment have been due to its land-use requirement, and related constraints. Utility-scale solar farms require substantial surface area, which can be difficult to allocate in densely populated or highly urbanized areas. As a result, large-scale solar installations are often located in rural areas or at a significant distance from major population centres, which may require additional infrastructure, such as upgrading of the grid to rural areas and the construction of high-voltage transmission lines, to transmit electricity efficiently to major population centres.

== Technologies ==
Solar power plants use one of two technologies:

- Photovoltaic (PV) systems use solar panels, either on rooftops or in ground-mounted solar farms, converting sunlight directly into electric power.
- Concentrated solar power (CSP) systems use mirrors or lenses to concentrate sunlight to extreme heat to make steam, which drives a turbine to generate electricity.

=== Solar cells ===
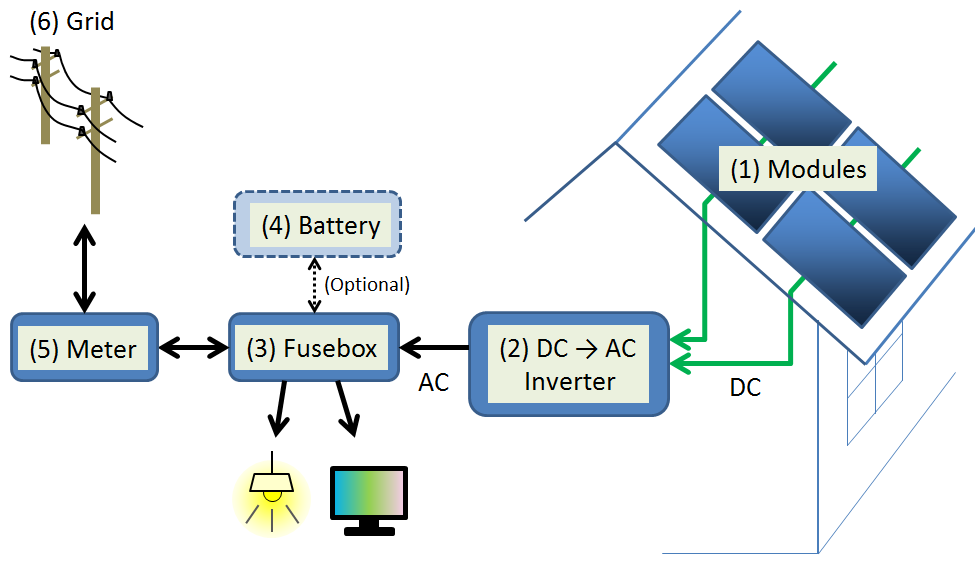
Schematics of a grid-connected residential PV power system

The photovoltaic effect in solar cells converts light into electric current. The first solar cell was constructed by Charles Fritts in the 1880s. The German industrialist Ernst Werner von Siemens was among those who recognized the importance of this discovery. In 1931, the German engineer Bruno Lange developed a photo cell using silver selenide in place of copper oxide, although the prototype selenium cells converted less than 1% of incident light into electricity. Following the work of Russell Ohl in the 1940s, researchers Gerald Pearson, Calvin Fuller and Daryl Chapin created the silicon solar cell in 1954. These early solar cells cost US$286/watt and reached efficiencies of 4.5–6%. In 1957, Mohamed M. Atalla developed the process of silicon surface passivation by thermal oxidation at Bell Labs. The surface passivation process has since been critical to solar cell efficiency.

As of 2022 over 90% of the market is crystalline silicon. Other types of solar cell include thin-film solar cells, made by depositing one or more thin layers, or thin film (TF) of photovoltaic material on a substrate, such as glass, plastic or metal.

The array of a photovoltaic system, or PV system, produces direct current (DC) power which fluctuates with the sunlight's intensity. For practical use this usually requires conversion to alternating current (AC), through the use of inverters. Multiple solar cells are connected inside panels. Panels are wired together to form arrays, then tied to an inverter, which produces power at the desired voltage, and for AC, the desired frequency/phase.

Many residential PV systems are connected to the grid when available, especially in developed countries with large markets. In these grid-connected PV systems energy storage is optional. In certain applications such as satellites, lighthouses, or in developing countries, batteries or additional power generators are often added as back-ups. Such stand-alone power systems permit operations at night and at other times of limited sunlight.

=== Concentrated solar power ===
A parabolic collector concentrates sunlight onto a tube in its focal point.

Concentrated solar power (CSP), also called "concentrated solar thermal", uses lenses or mirrors and tracking systems to concentrate sunlight, then uses the resulting heat to generate electricity from conventional steam-driven turbines.

As of 2021 the levelized cost of electricity from CSP is over twice that of PV. As of 2022, less than 1% of solar power comes from CSP.

=== Hybrid systems ===
A hybrid system combines solar with energy storage or one or more other forms of generation. Hydro, wind and batteries are commonly combined with solar. The combined generation may enable the system to vary power output with demand, or at least smooth the solar power fluctuation. There is much hydro worldwide, and adding solar panels on or around existing hydro reservoirs is particularly useful, because hydro is usually more flexible than wind and cheaper at scale than batteries, and existing power lines can sometimes be used.

== Development and deployment ==
Per capita solar power usage

Share of energy from solar power

=== Early days ===
The early development of solar technologies starting in the 1860s was driven by an expectation that coal would soon become scarce, such as experiments by Augustin Mouchot. Charles Fritts installed the world's first rooftop photovoltaic solar array, using 1%-efficient selenium cells, on a New York City roof in 1884. However, development of solar technologies stagnated in the early 20th century in the face of the increasing availability, economy, and utility of coal and petroleum. Bell Telephone Laboratories' 1950s research used silicon wafers with a thin coating of boron. The "Bell Solar Battery" was described as 6% efficient, with a square yard of the panels generating 50 watts. The first satellite with solar panels was launched in 1957.

By the 1970s, solar panels were still too expensive for much other than satellites. In 1974 it was estimated that only six private homes in all of North America were entirely heated or cooled by functional solar power systems. However, the 1973 oil embargo and 1979 energy crisis caused a reorganization of energy policies around the world and brought renewed attention to developing solar technologies.

Deployment strategies focused on incentive programs such as the Federal Photovoltaic Utilization Program in the US and the Sunshine Program in Japan. Other efforts included the formation of research facilities in the United States (SERI, now NREL), Japan (NEDO), and Germany (Fraunhofer ISE). Between 1970 and 1983 installations of photovoltaic systems grew rapidly. In the United States, President Jimmy Carter set a target of producing 20% of U.S. energy from solar by the year 2000, but his successor, Ronald Reagan, removed the funding for research into renewables. Falling oil prices in the early 1980s moderated the growth of photovoltaics from 1984 to 1996.

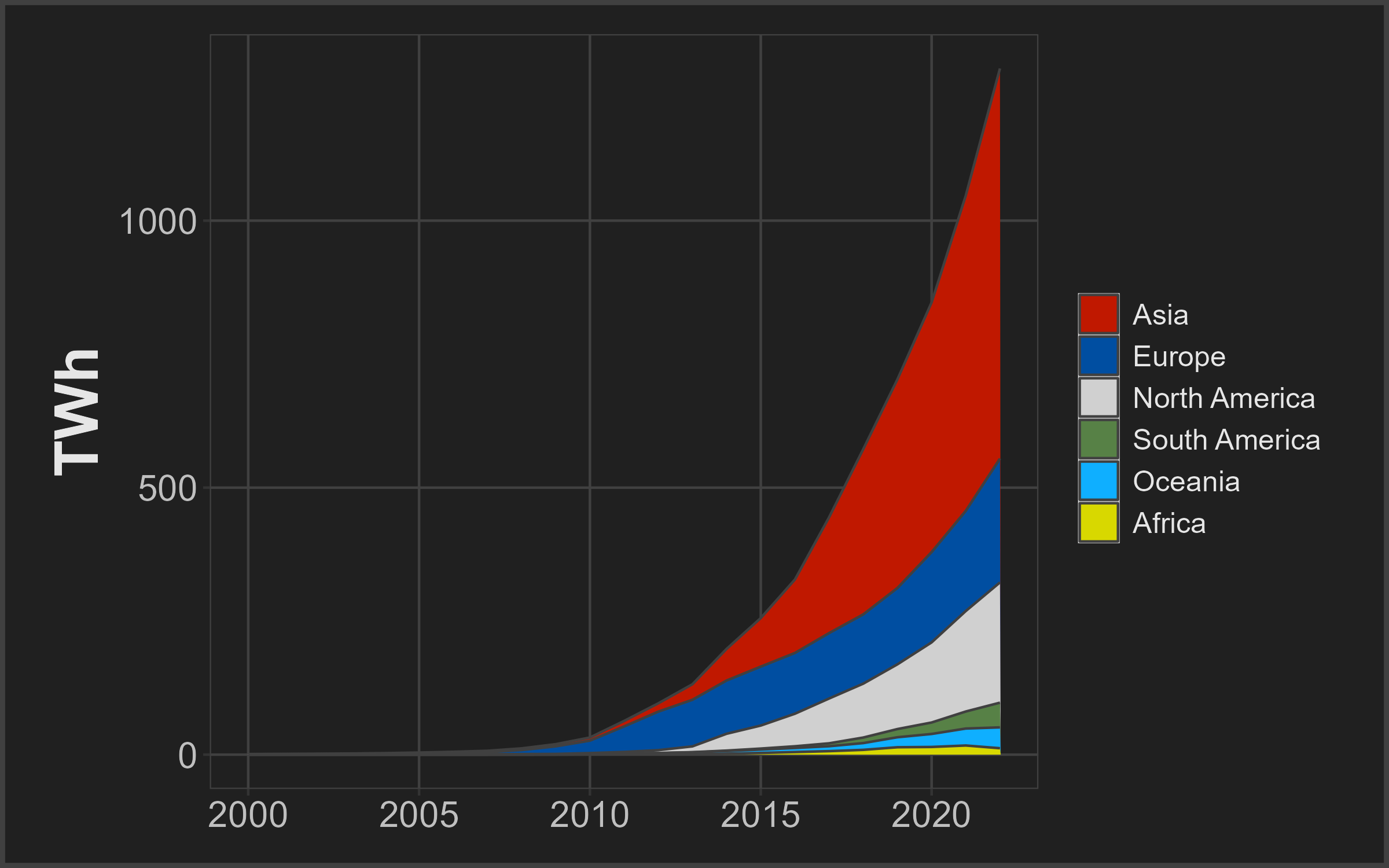
Yearly solar generation by continent

Benefitting from favorable policies and declining costs of modules, photovoltaic solar installation has grown consistently. In 2023, China added 60% of the world's new capacity.

The growth of solar PV on a semi-log scale since 1996

Electricity production by source

=== Mid-1990s to 2010 ===
In the mid-1990s development of both residential and commercial rooftop solar, as well as utility-scale photovoltaic power stations, began to accelerate again due to supply issues with oil and natural gas, global warming concerns, and the improving economics of PV relative to other energy technologies. In the early 2000s, the adoption of feed-in tariffs—a policy mechanism that gives renewables priority on the grid and defines a fixed price for the generated electricity—led to a high level of investment security and to a soaring number of PV deployments in Europe.

=== 2010s ===
For several years, worldwide growth of solar PV was driven by European deployment, but it then shifted to Asia, especially China and Japan, and to a growing number of countries and regions all over the world. Chinese manufacturers of solar equipment grew to be the largest. Although concentrated solar power capacity grew more than tenfold, it remained a tiny proportion of the total, because the cost of utility-scale solar PV fell by 85% between 2010 and 2020, while CSP costs only fell 68% in the same timeframe.

=== 2020s ===
Solar and wind power are scaling up faster than previous sources of electricity. Declining costs, modular design, and improved battery storage help the transition to renewable energy.

In 2025, growth in solar, wind and other low-carbon electric power exceeded the overall growth in demand for electricity, reducing reliance on fossil fuels and helping to curb greenhouse gas emissions.

Despite the rising cost of materials, such as polysilicon, during the 2021–2022 global energy crisis, utility scale solar was still the least expensive energy source in many countries due to the rising costs of other energy sources, such as natural gas. In 2022, global solar generation capacity exceeded 1 TW for the first time. However, fossil-fuel subsidies have slowed the growth of solar generation capacity. Africa is the world's fastest growing solar power market, aided mostly by China.

==== Current status ====
About half of installed capacity is utility scale. According to the International Energy Agency (IEA), annual global solar PV capacity additions increased by approximately 12% in 2025, surpassing 600 GW in a single year for the first time and bringing cumulative global installed solar PV capacity to around 2,800 GW (2.8 TW), making solar PV the power generation technology with the largest installed capacity worldwide. Thirty countries installed more than 1 GW of solar PV capacity during 2025, while total global renewable power capacity reached 5,149 GW.

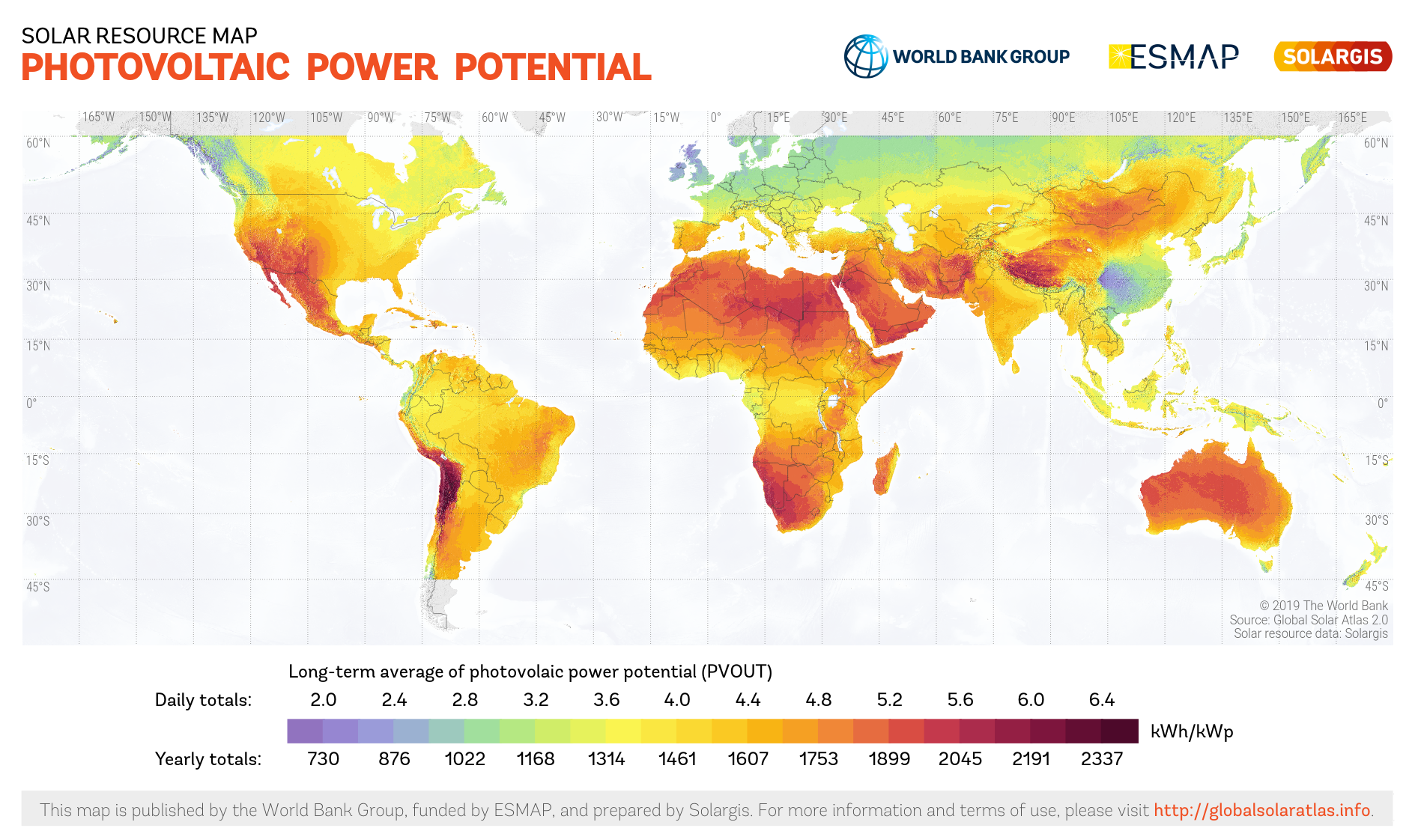
Map of solar resources from World bank

==== Forecasts ====
Actual annual deployments of solar PV vs predictions by the IEA. Their predictions have consistently grossly underestimated the actual increases.

Solar is forecast to become the largest source of renewable power before the end of the 2020s, exceeding the output of hydropower. Utility scale is forecast to become the largest source of electricity in all regions except sub-Saharan Africa by 2050.

=== Photovoltaic power stations ===
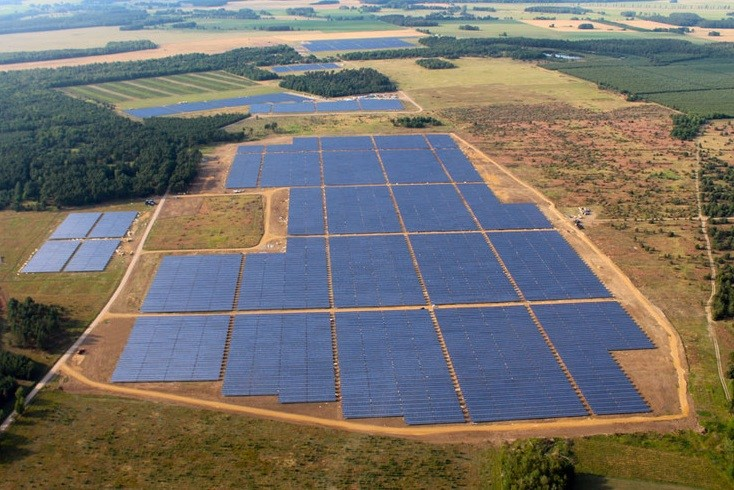
The 40.5 MW Jännersdorf Solar Park in Prignitz, Germany

A photovoltaic power station, also known as a solar park, solar farm, or solar power plant, is a large-scale grid-connected photovoltaic power system (PV system) designed for the supply of merchant power. They are different from most building-mounted and other decentralized solar power because they supply power at the utility level, rather than to a local user or users. Utility-scale solar is sometimes used to describe this type of project.

This approach differs from concentrated solar power, the other major large-scale solar generation technology, which uses heat to drive a variety of conventional generator systems. Both approaches have their own advantages and disadvantages, but to date, for a variety of reasons, photovoltaic technology has seen much wider use. As of 2019, about 97% of utility-scale solar power capacity was PV.

In some countries, the nameplate capacity of photovoltaic power stations is rated in megawatt-peak (MW_{p}), which refers to the solar array's theoretical maximum DC power output. In other countries, the manufacturer states the surface and the efficiency. However, Canada, Japan, Spain, and the United States often specify using the converted lower nominal power output in MW_{AC}, a measure more directly comparable to other forms of power generation. Most solar parks are developed at a scale of at least 1 MW_{p}. As of 2018, the world's largest operating photovoltaic power stations surpassed 1 gigawatt. At the end of 2019, about 9,000 solar farms were larger than 4 MW_{AC} (utility scale), with a combined capacity of over 220 GW_{AC}.

Most of the existing large-scale photovoltaic power stations are owned and operated by independent power producers, but the involvement of community and utility-owned projects is increasing. Previously, almost all were supported at least in part by regulatory incentives such as feed-in tariffs or tax credits, but as levelized costs fell significantly in the 2010s and grid parity has been reached in most markets, external incentives are usually not needed.

=== Concentrating solar power stations ===
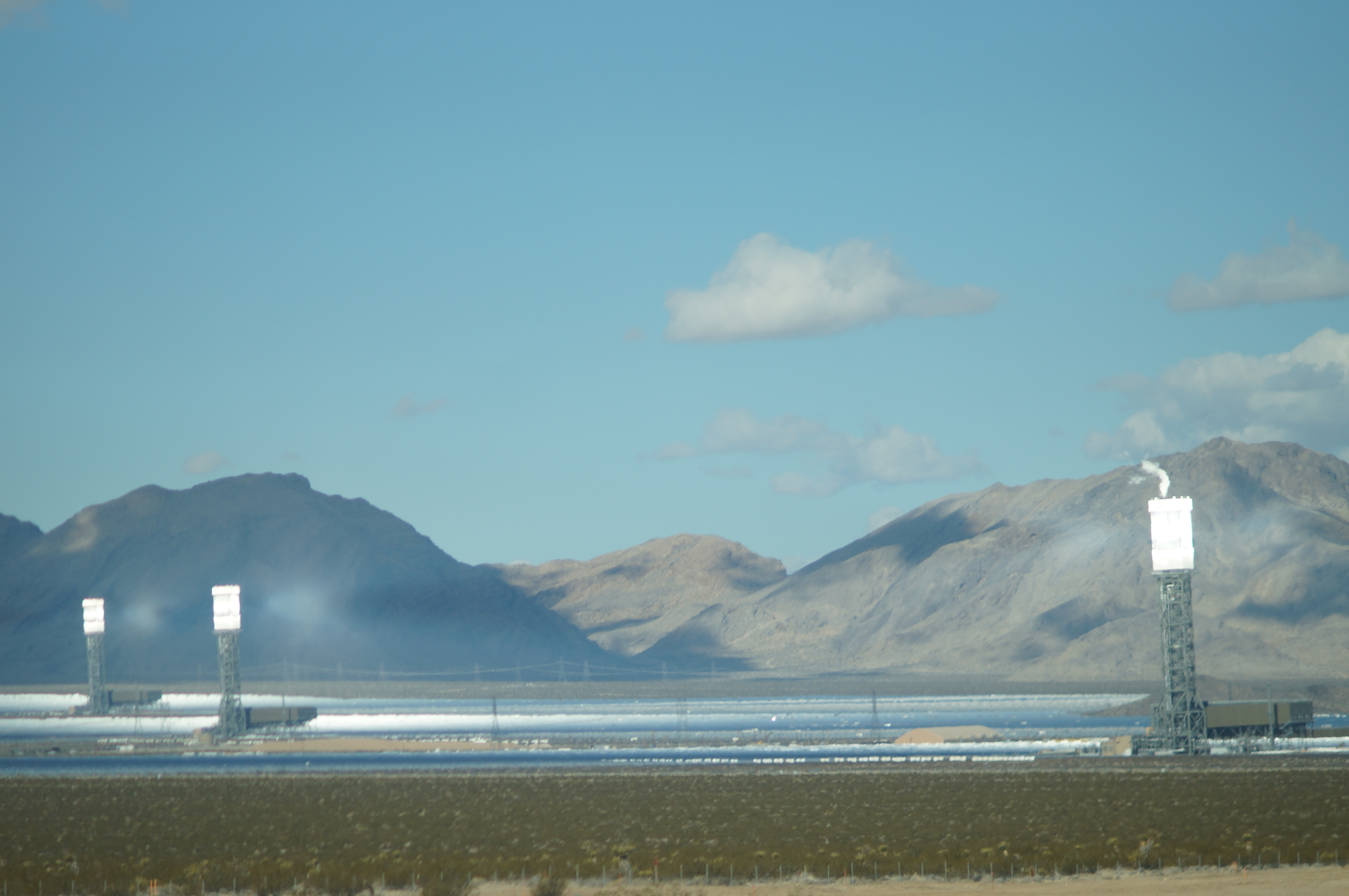
Ivanpah Solar Electric Generating System with all three towers under load

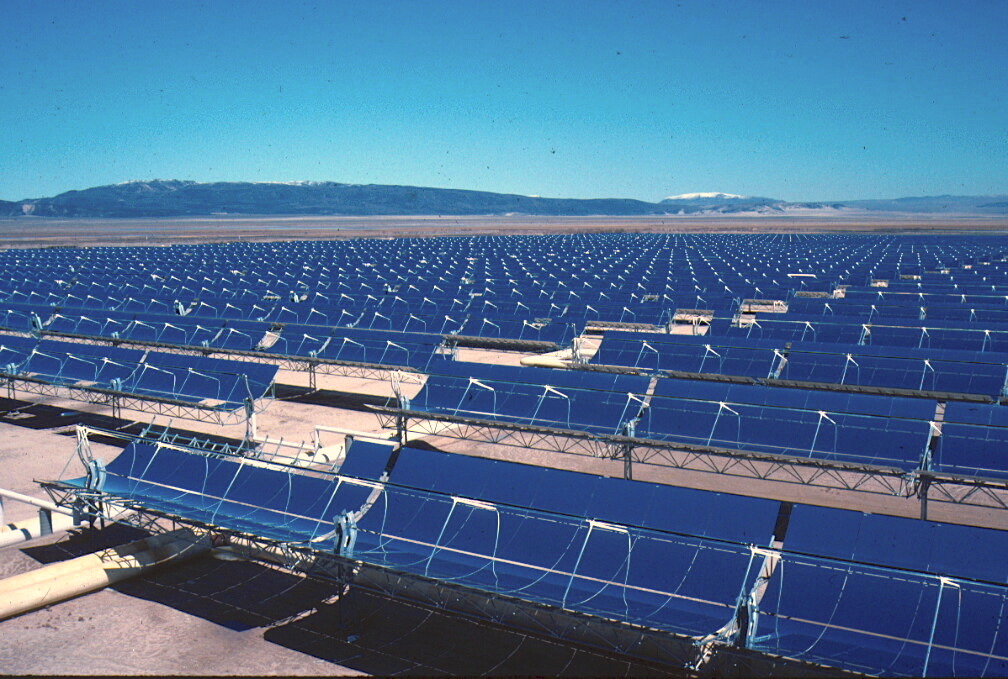
Part of the 354 MW Solar Energy Generating Systems (SEGS) parabolic trough solar complex in northern San Bernardino County, California

Commercial concentrating solar power (CSP) plants, also called "solar thermal power stations", were first developed in the 1980s. The 377 MW Ivanpah Solar Power Facility, located in California's Mojave Desert, is the world's largest solar thermal power plant project. Other large CSP plants include the Solnova Solar Power Station (150 MW), the Andasol solar power station (150 MW), and Extresol Solar Power Station (150 MW), all in Spain. The principal advantage of CSP is the ability to efficiently add thermal storage, allowing the dispatching of electricity over up to a 24-hour period. Since peak electricity demand typically occurs at about 5 pm, many CSP power plants use 3 to 5 hours of thermal storage.

== Economics ==
=== Cost per watt ===
In many countries, solar power is the lowest cost source of electricity. The typical cost factors for solar power include the costs of the modules, the frame to hold them, wiring, inverters, labour cost, any land that might be required, the grid connection, maintenance and the solar insolation that location will receive.

Photovoltaic systems use no fuel, and modules typically last 25 to 40 years. Thus upfront capital and financing costs make up 80% to 90% of the cost of solar power, which is a problem for countries where contracts may not be honoured, such as some African countries. Some countries are considering price caps, whereas others prefer contracts for difference.

=== Installation prices ===
Expenses of high-power band solar modules has greatly decreased over time. Beginning in 1982, the cost per kW was approximately 27,000 American dollars, and in 2006 the cost dropped to approximately 4,000 American dollars per kW. The PV system in 1992 cost approximately 16,000 American dollars per kW and it dropped to approximately 6,000 American dollars per kW in 2008. In 2025 in the US, residential solar costs around 2.50 dollars/watt (but solar shingles cost much more). As of 2025 utility solar costs are around 25 UScent/watt.

=== Productivity by location ===
The productivity of solar power in a region depends on solar irradiance, which varies through the day and year and is influenced by latitude and climate. PV system output power also depends on ambient temperature, wind speed, solar spectrum, the local soiling conditions, and other factors.

Onshore wind power tends to be the cheapest source of electricity in Northern Eurasia, Canada, some parts of the United States, and Patagonia in Argentina whereas in other parts of the world mostly solar power (or less often a combination of wind, solar and other low carbon energy) is thought to be best. Modelling by Exeter University suggests that by 2030, solar will be least expensive everywhere except in some Nordic countries.

The locations with highest annual solar irradiance lie in the arid tropics and subtropics. Deserts lying in low latitudes usually have few clouds and can receive sunshine for more than ten hours a day. These hot deserts form the Global Sun Belt circling the world. This belt consists of extensive swathes of land in Northern Africa, Southern Africa, Southwest Asia, Middle East, and Australia, as well as the much smaller deserts of North and South America.

Thus solar is (or is predicted to become) the cheapest source of energy in all of Central America, Africa, the Middle East, India, South-east Asia, Australia, and several other regions.

Different measurements of solar irradiance (direct normal irradiance, global horizontal irradiance) are mapped below:

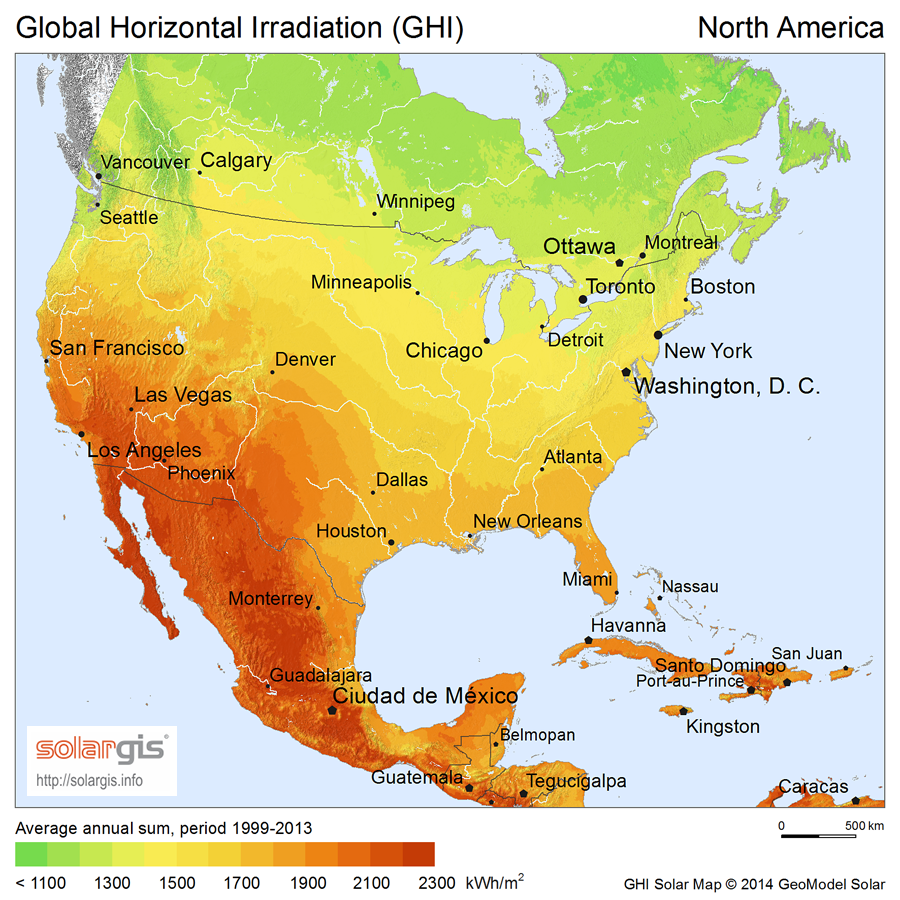
North America

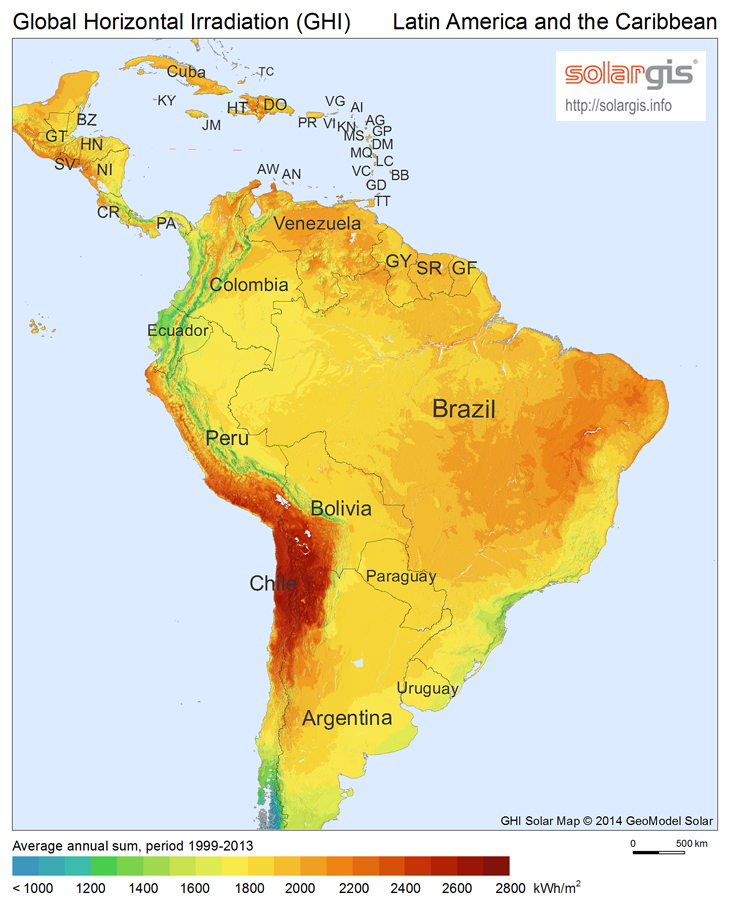
South America

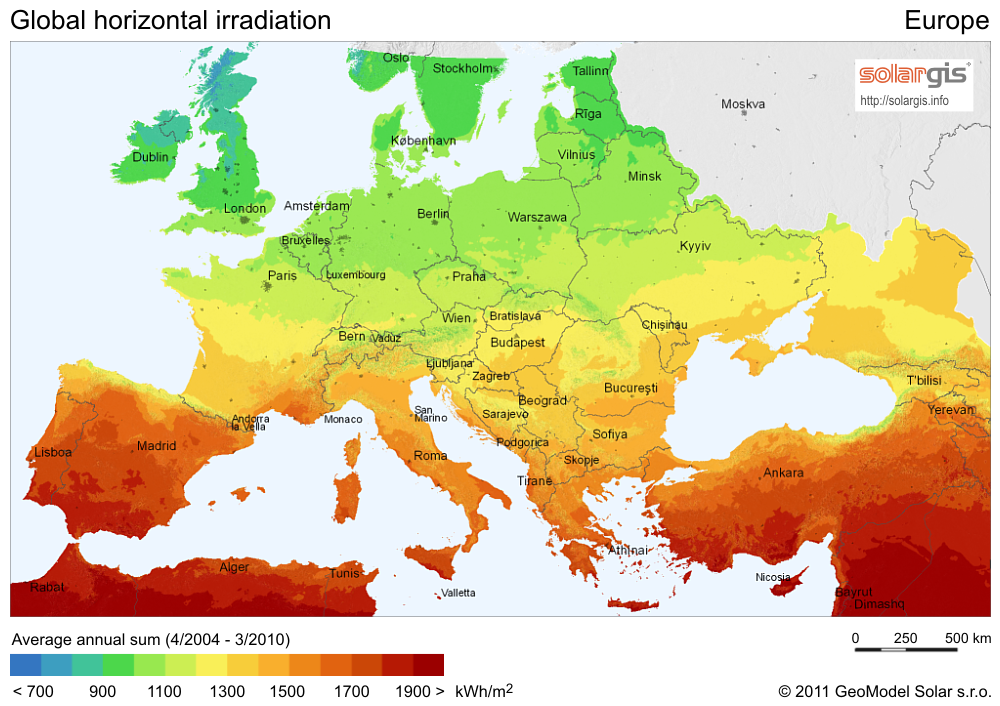
Europe

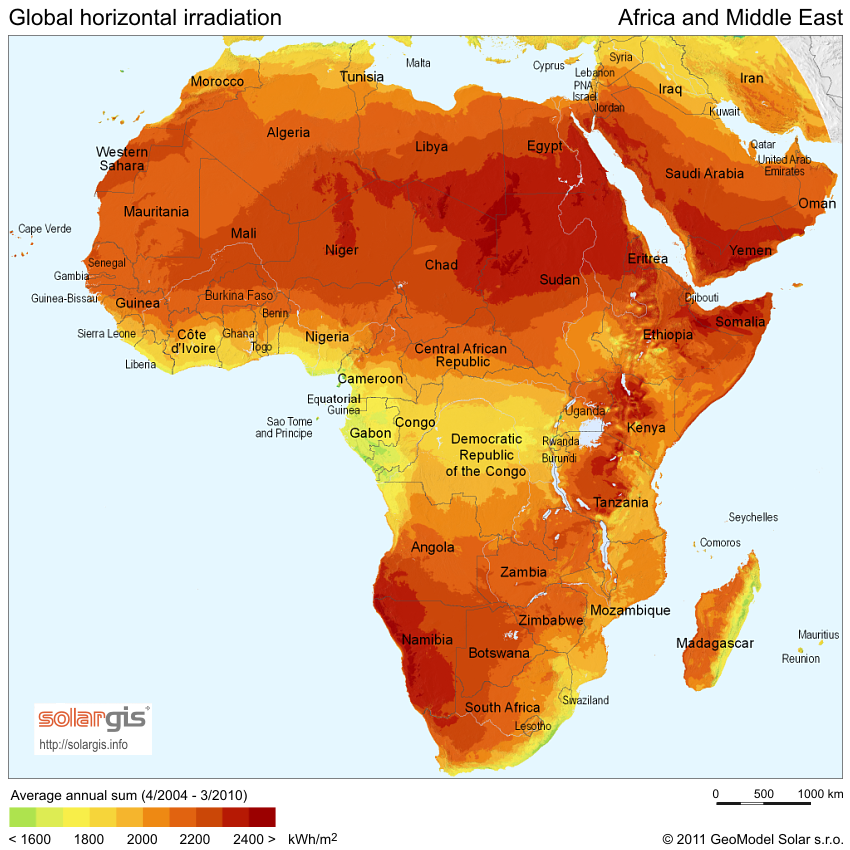
Africa and Middle East

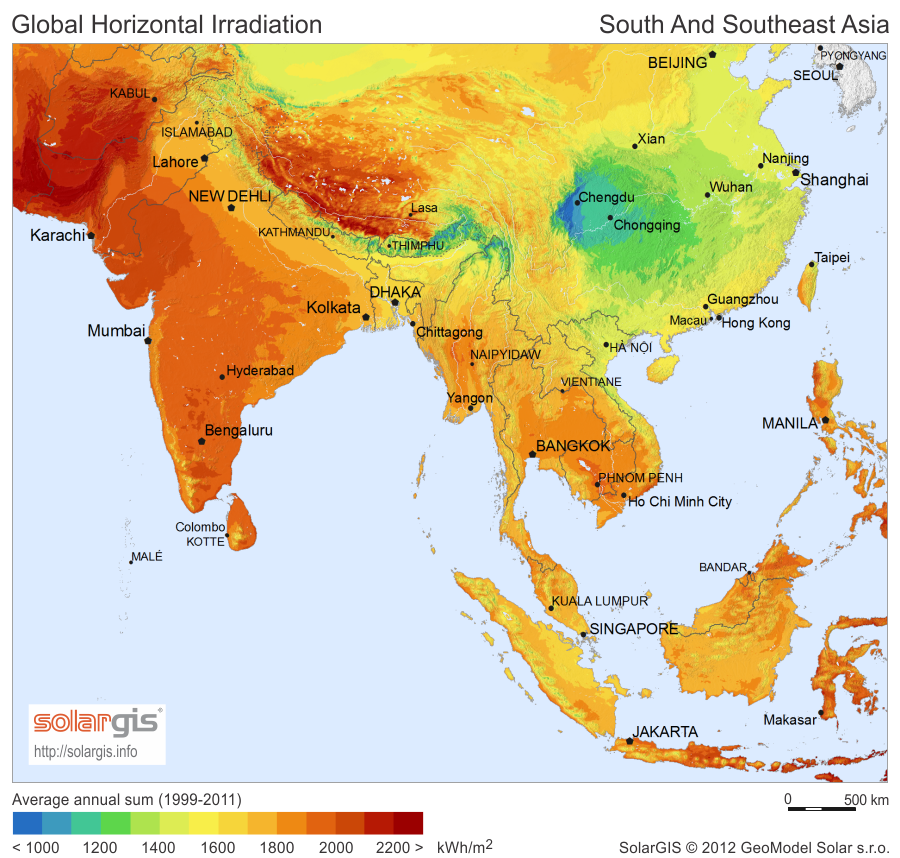
South and South-East Asia

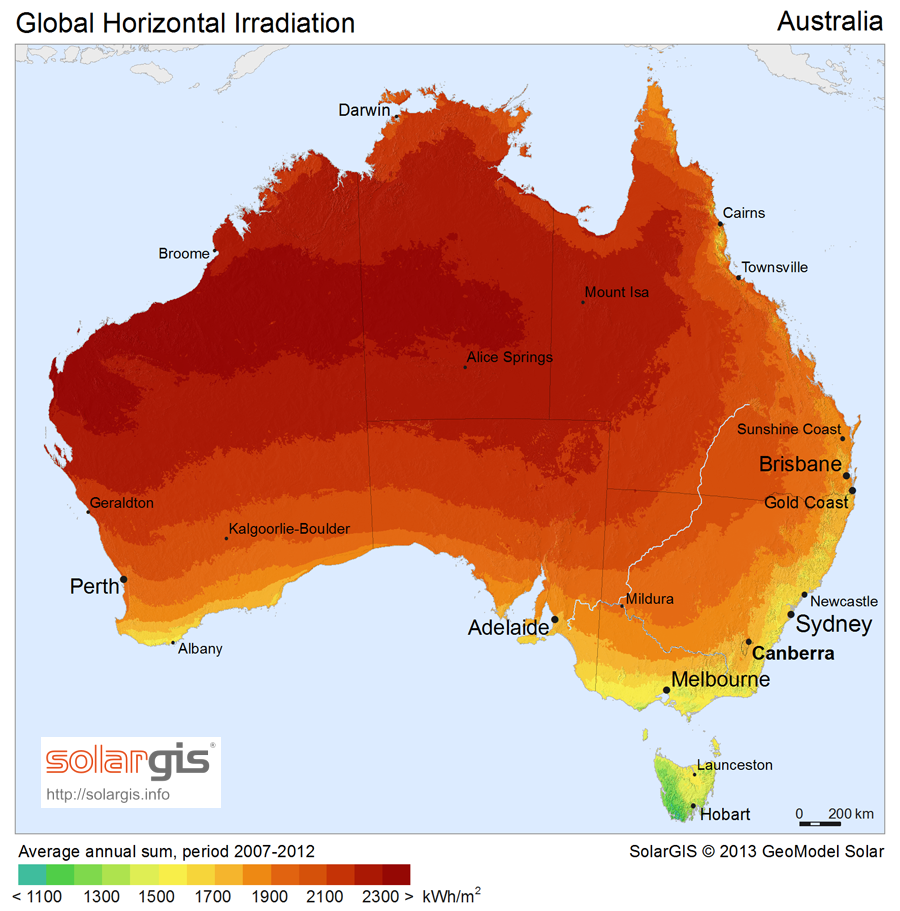
Australia

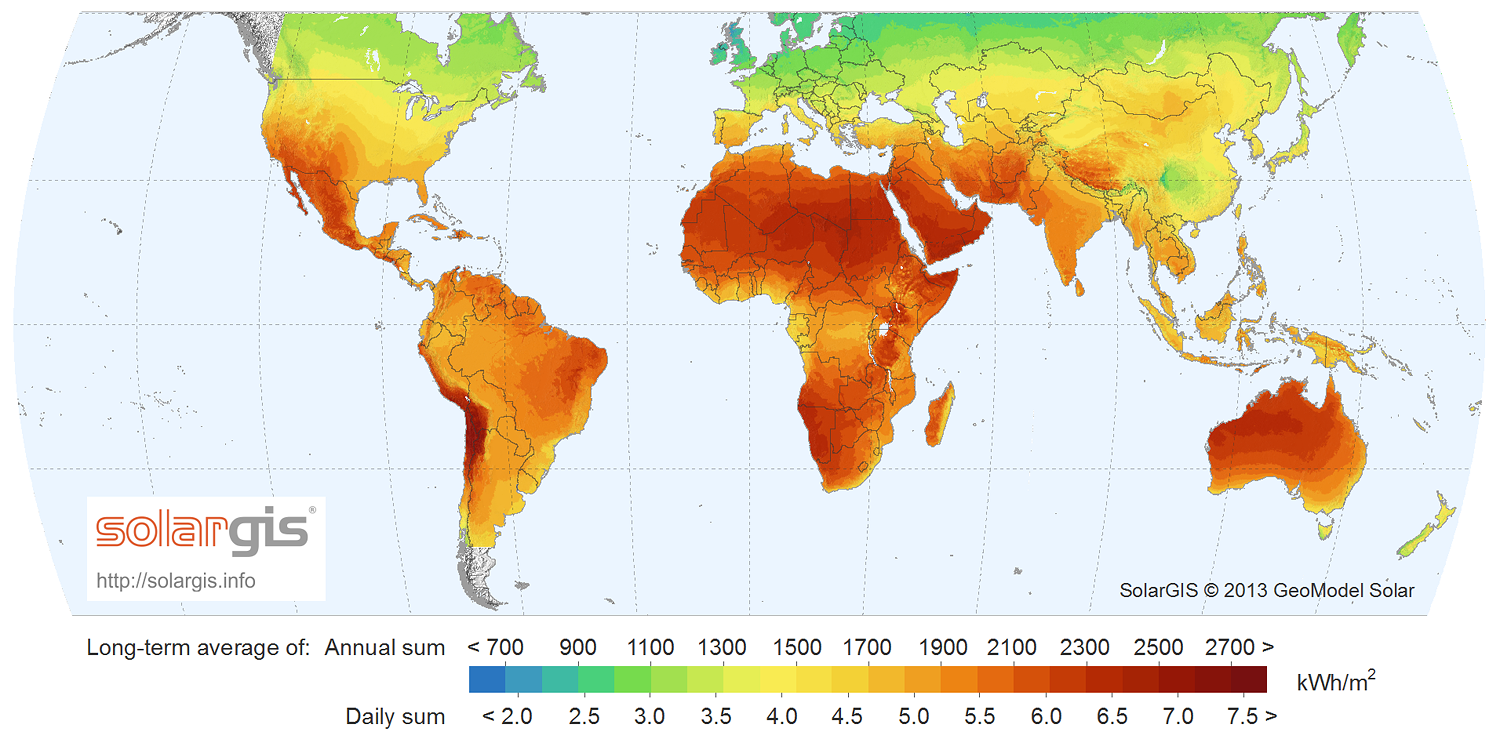
World

=== Self-consumption ===
In cases of self-consumption of solar energy, the payback time is calculated based on how much electricity is not purchased from the grid. However, in many cases, the patterns of generation and consumption do not coincide, and some or all of the energy is fed back into the grid. The electricity is sold, and at other times when energy is taken from the grid, electricity is bought. The relative costs and prices obtained affect the economics. In many markets, the price paid for sold PV electricity is significantly lower than the price of bought electricity, which incentivizes self-consumption. Moreover, separate self-consumption incentives have been used in e.g., Germany and Italy. Grid interaction regulation has also included limitations of grid feed-in in some regions in Germany with high amounts of installed PV capacity. By increasing self-consumption, the grid feed-in can be limited without curtailment, which wastes electricity. In tropical net-billing markets such as Thailand, where residential retail tariffs (4.13–5.80 THB/kWh) exceed grid export compensation (2.20 THB/kWh), a 5 kW crystalline silicon rooftop system operating at a specific yield of 1,400 kWh/kWp/year achieves a levelized cost of electricity of 0.84 THB/kWh and a payback period of 5.5 to 8.1 years depending on daytime self-consumption.

A good match between generation and consumption is key for high self-consumption. The match can be improved with batteries or controllable electricity consumption. However, batteries are expensive, and profitability may require the provision of other services from them besides self-consumption increase, for example avoiding power outages. Hot water storage tanks with electric heating with heat pumps or resistance heaters can provide low-cost storage for self-consumption of solar power. Shiftable loads, such as dishwashers, tumble dryers and washing machines, can provide controllable consumption with only a limited effect on the users, but their effect on self-consumption of solar power may be limited.

=== Energy pricing, incentives and taxes ===
The original political purpose of incentive policies for PV was to facilitate an initial small-scale deployment to begin to grow the industry, even where the cost of PV was significantly above grid parity, to allow the industry to achieve the economies of scale necessary to reach grid parity. Since reaching grid parity, some policies are implemented to promote national energy independence, high tech job creation and reduction of CO_{2} emissions.

==== Net metering ====
Net metering is a pricing method for residential solar: the price of the electricity produced is the same as the price supplied to the consumer, and the consumer is billed on the difference between production and consumption.

==== Community solar ====
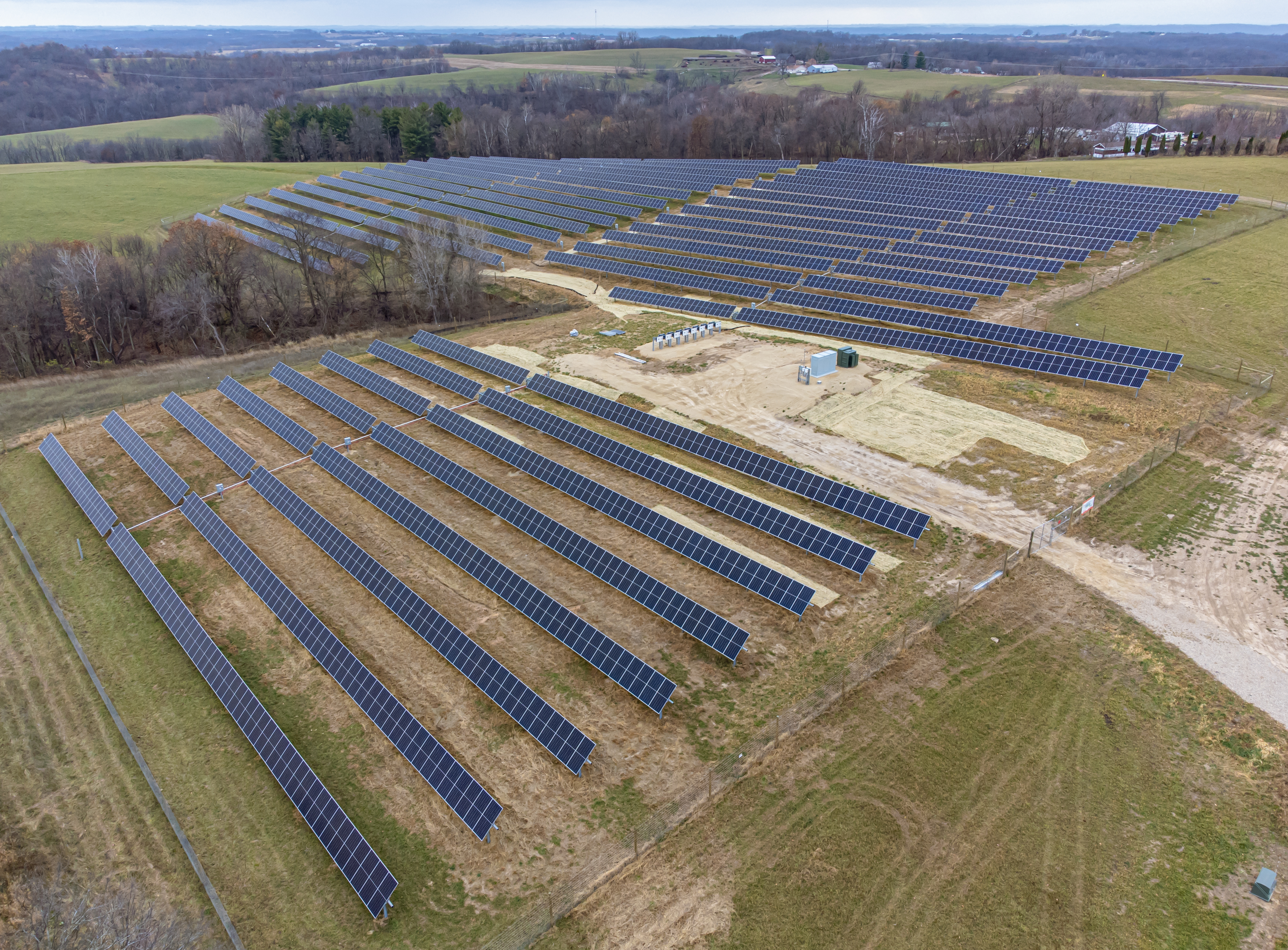
Community solar farm in the town of Wheatland, Wisconsin

A community solar project is a solar power installation that accepts capital from and provides output credit and tax benefits to multiple customers, including individuals, businesses, nonprofits, and other investors. Participants typically invest in or subscribe to a certain kW capacity or kWh generation of remote electrical production.

==== Taxes ====
In some countries tariffs (import taxes) are imposed on imported solar panels.

== Grid integration ==
Energy from sunlight or other renewable energy is converted to potential energy for storage in devices such as electric batteries or higher-elevation water reservoirs. The stored potential energy is later converted to electricity that is added to the power grid, even when the original energy source is not available.

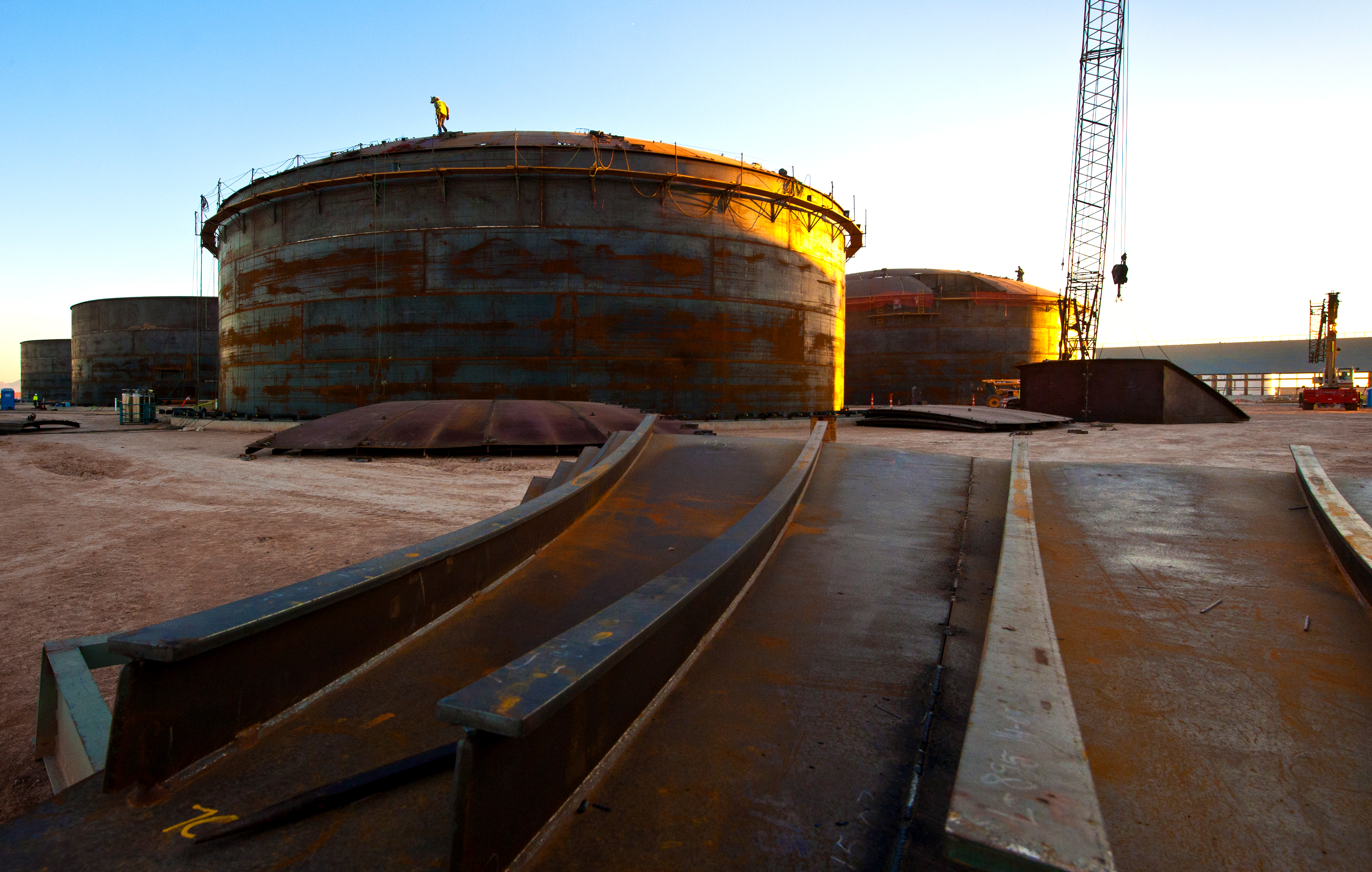
Salt Tanks provide thermal energy storage so that output can be provided after sunset, and output can be scheduled to meet demand requirements. The 280 MW Solana Generating Station is designed to provide six hours of energy storage. This allows the plant to generate about 38% of its rated capacity over the course of a year.

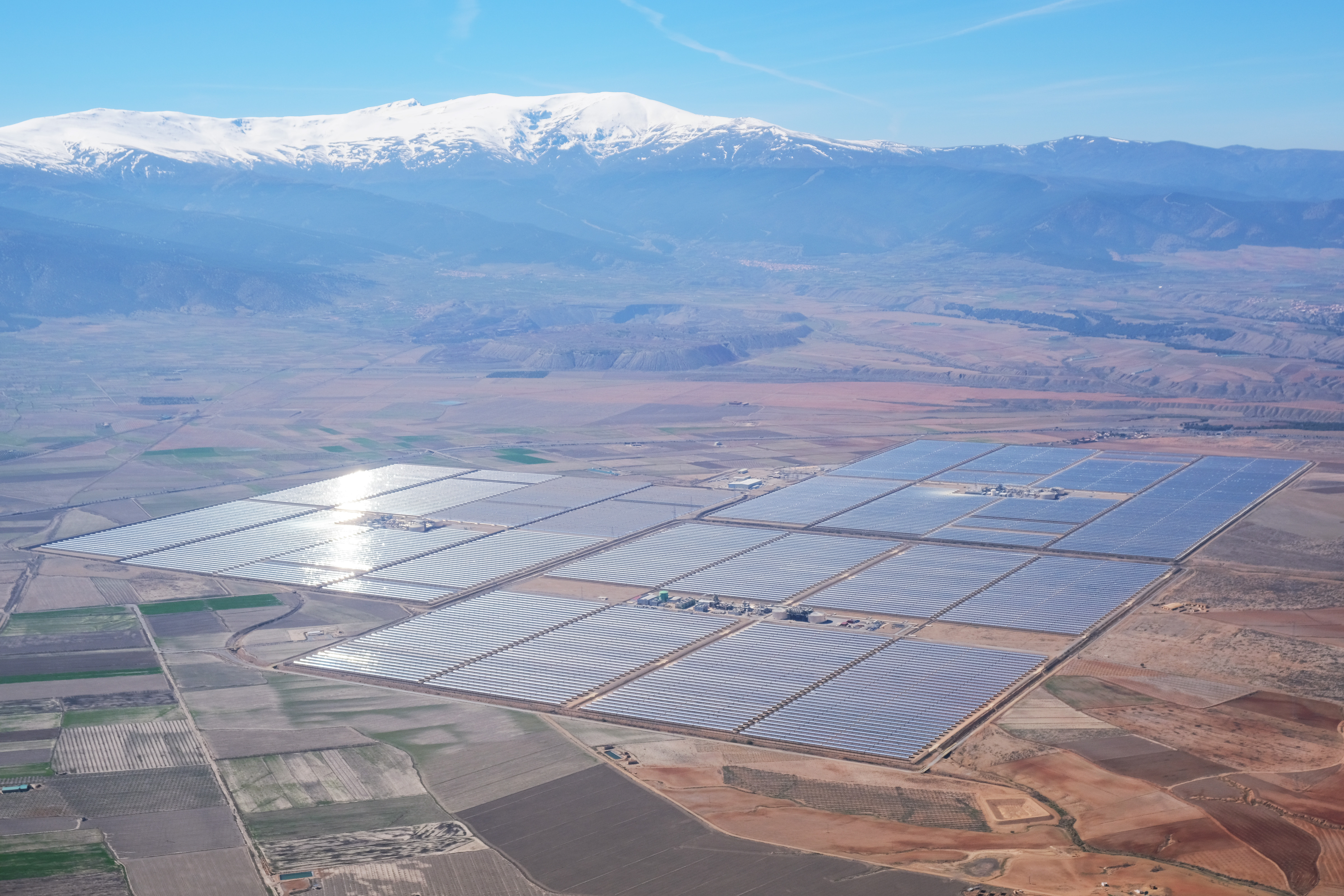
Thermal energy storage. The Andasol CSP plant uses tanks of molten salt to store solar energy.

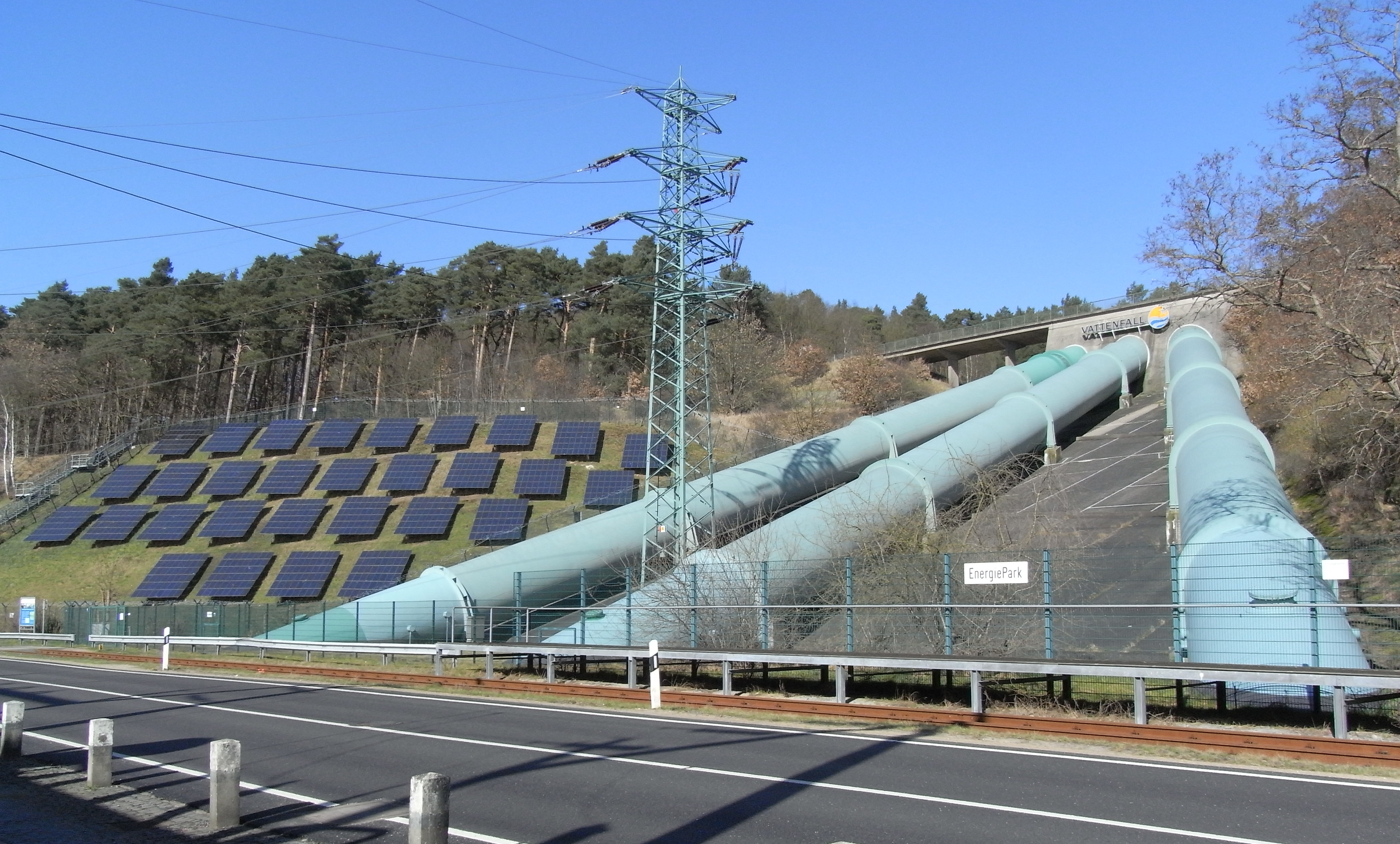
Pumped-storage hydroelectricity (PSH). This facility in Geesthacht, Germany, also includes a solar array.

=== Variability ===
The overwhelming majority of electricity produced worldwide is used immediately because traditional generators can adapt to demand and storage is generally more expensive. Both solar power and wind power are sources of variable renewable power, meaning that all available output must be used locally, transmitted elsewhere to be used, or stored (e.g., in a battery). Since solar energy is not available at night, storing it so as to have continuous electricity availability is potentially an important issue, particularly in off-grid applications and for future 100% renewable energy scenarios. As solar power is intermittent and depends on both daylight and weather conditions, countries following net-zero pathways that rely heavily on solar energy typically need to integrate it with large-scale battery storage, pumped hydroelectric energy storage, or long-distance power transmission to help maintain grid reliability.

Solar power can be forecast to some extent by time based on the time of day, location, and seasons, although short-term generation also depends on weather conditions. The challenge of integrating solar power in any given electric utility varies significantly. In regions with hot summers and mild winters, solar tends to be well matched to daytime cooling demands.

=== Energy storage ===
In stand alone PV systems, batteries are traditionally used to store excess electricity. With grid-connected photovoltaic power systems, excess electricity can be sent to the electrical grid. Net metering and feed-in tariff programs give these systems a credit for the electricity they produce. This credit offsets electricity provided from the grid when the system cannot meet demand, effectively trading with the grid instead of storing excess electricity. When wind and solar are a small fraction of the grid power, other generation techniques can adjust their output appropriately, but as these forms of variable power grow, additional balance on the grid is needed. As prices are rapidly declining, PV systems increasingly use rechargeable batteries to store a surplus to be used later at night. Batteries used for grid-storage stabilize electrical grids by leveling out peak loads for several hours.

Most home batteries are lithium-ion, mostly in the form of lithium iron phosphate batteries (especially since around 2021), but also some nickel manganese cobalt batteries. Lithium-ion batteries have the potential to replace lead-acid batteries in the near future, as they are being intensively developed and lower prices are expected due to economies of scale provided by large production facilities such as the Tesla Gigafactory 1. In addition, the Li-ion batteries of plug-in electric cars may serve as future storage devices in a vehicle-to-grid system. Since most vehicles are parked an average of 95% of the time, their batteries could be used to let electricity flow from the car to the power lines and back.

Retired electric vehicle (EV) batteries can be repurposed. Other rechargeable batteries used for distributed PV systems include, sodium–sulfur and vanadium redox batteries, two prominent types of a molten salt and a flow battery, respectively.

The need for adequate storage has become increasingly critical as solar generation scales up. In Europe, insufficient storage and transmission capacity could result in approximately 40 terawatt-hours of solar electricity being wasted through curtailment in 2026, equivalent to powering Greater London for a year — a 25% increase compared to 2025.

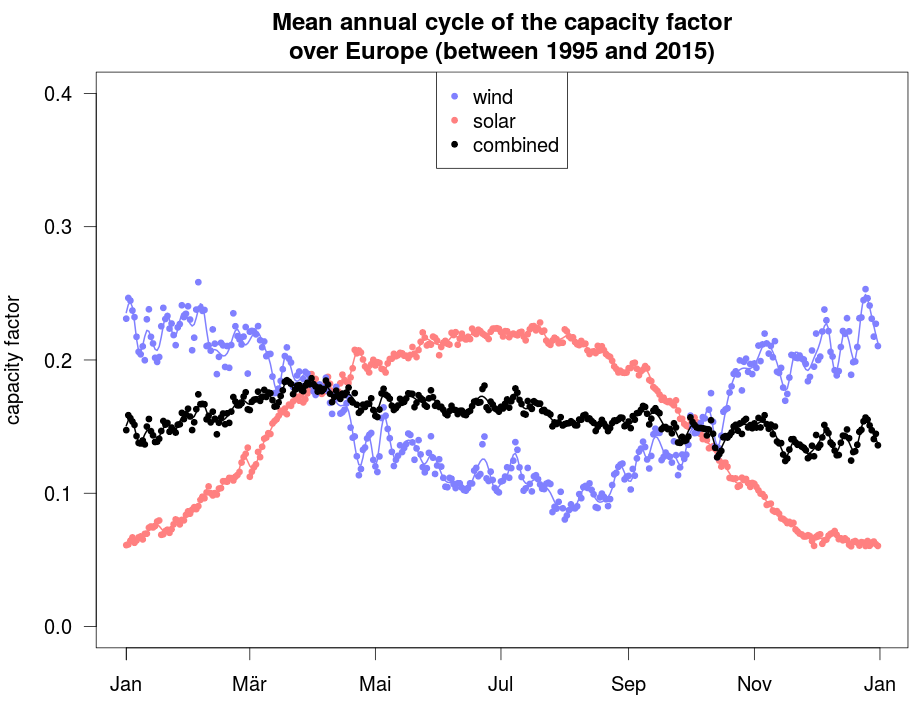
Seasonal cycle of capacity factors for wind and photovoltaics in Europe shown under idealized assumptions. The figure illustrates the balancing effects of wind and solar energy at the seasonal scale (Kaspar et al., 2019).

Concentrated solar power plants may use thermal storage to store solar energy, such as in high-temperature molten salts. These salts are an effective storage medium because they are low-cost, have a high specific heat capacity, and can deliver heat at temperatures compatible with conventional power systems.

=== Other technologies ===
Solar power plants, while they can be curtailed, usually simply output as much power as possible. Therefore in an electricity system without sufficient grid energy storage, generation from other sources (coal, biomass, natural gas, nuclear, hydroelectricity) generally go up and down in reaction to the rise and fall of solar electricity and variations in demand (see load following power plant).

Conventional hydroelectric dams work very well in conjunction with solar power; water can be held back or released from a reservoir as required. Where suitable geography is not available, pumped-storage hydroelectricity can use solar power to pump water to a high reservoir on sunny days, then the energy is recovered at night and in bad weather by releasing water via a hydroelectric plant to a low reservoir where the cycle can begin again.

While hydroelectric and natural gas plants can quickly respond to changes in load; coal, biomass and nuclear plants usually take considerable time to respond to load and can only be scheduled to follow the predictable variation. Depending on local circumstances, beyond about 20–40% of total generation, grid-connected intermittent sources like solar tend to require investment in some combination of grid interconnections, energy storage or demand side management. In countries with high solar generation, such as Australia, electricity prices may become negative in the middle of the day when solar generation is high, thus incentivizing new battery storage.

The combination of wind and solar PV has the advantage that the two sources complement each other because the peak operating times for each system occur at different times of the day and year. The power generation of such solar hybrid power systems is therefore more constant and fluctuates less than each of the two component subsystems. Solar power is seasonal, particularly in northern/southern climates, away from the equator, suggesting a need for long term seasonal storage in a medium such as hydrogen or pumped hydroelectric.

== Environmental effects ==
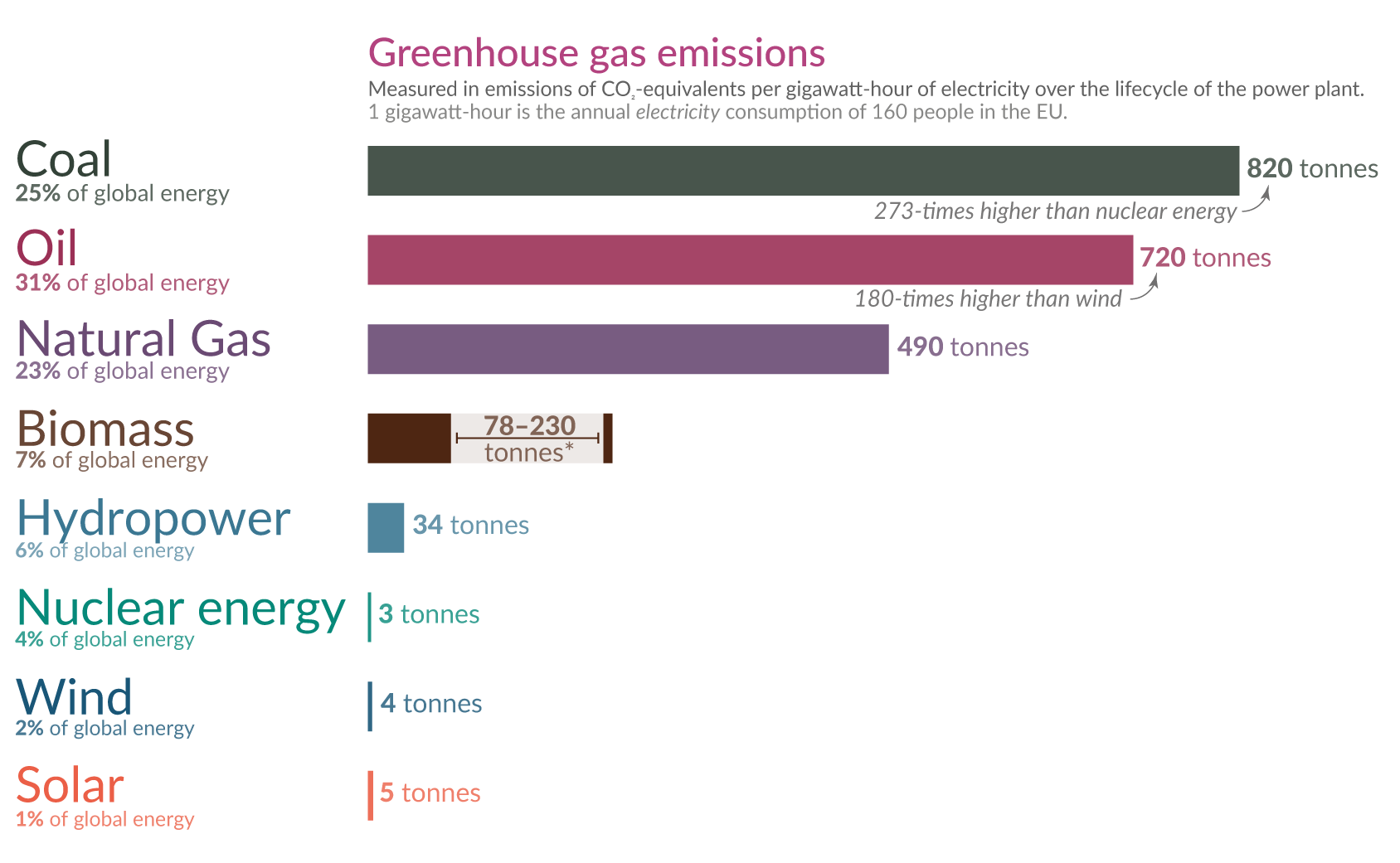
Greenhouse gas emissions per energy source. Solar power is one of the sources with the least greenhouse gas emissions.

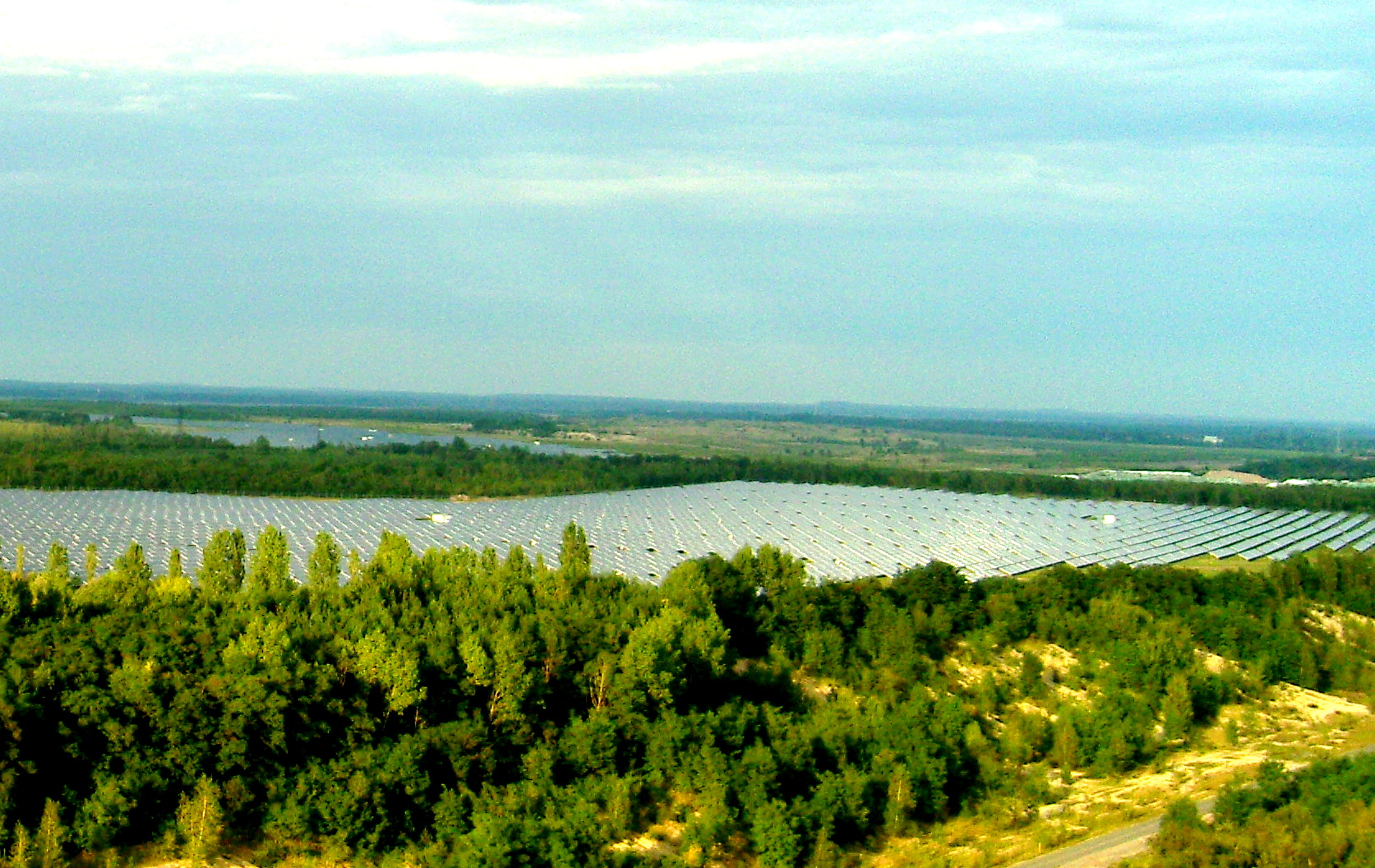
Part of the Senftenberg Solarpark, a solar photovoltaic power plant located on former open-pit mining areas close to the city of Senftenberg, in Eastern Germany. The 78 MW Phase 1 of the plant was completed within three months.

Solar power is cleaner than electricity from fossil fuels, and is better for the environment than burning things. Solar power does not lead to harmful emissions during operation, but the production of the panels creates some pollution. The carbon footprint of manufacturing is less than 1kg CO_{2}/Wp, and this is expected to fall as manufacturers use more clean electricity and recycled materials. Solar power carries an upfront cost to the environment via production with a carbon payback time of several years as of 2022, but offers clean energy for the remainder of their 30-year lifetime.

The life-cycle greenhouse-gas emissions of solar panels are less than 50 gram (g) per kilowatt-hour (kWh), but with battery storage could be up to 150 g/kWh. In contrast, a combined cycle gas-fired power plant without carbon capture and storage emits around 500 g/kWh, and a coal-fired power plant about 1000 g/kWh. Similar to all energy sources where their total life cycle emissions are mostly from construction, the switch to low carbon power in the manufacturing and transportation of solar devices would further reduce carbon emissions.

Lifecycle surface power density of solar power varies but averages about 7 W/m2, compared to about 240 for nuclear power and 480 for gas. However, when the land required for gas extraction and processing is accounted for, gas power is estimated to have not much higher power density than solar. According to a 2021 study, obtaining 25% to 80% of electricity from solar farms in their own territory by 2050 would require the panels to cover land ranging from 0.5% to 2.8% of the European Union, 0.3% to 1.4% in India, and 1.2% to 5.2% in Japan and South Korea. Occupation of such large areas for PV farms could drive residential opposition as well as lead to deforestation, removal of vegetation and conversion of farm land. However some countries, such as South Korea and Japan, use land for agriculture under PV, or floating solar, together with other low-carbon power sources. Worldwide land use has minimal ecological impact. The expansion of utility-scale solar energy development in agricultural landscapes presents an opportunity for the dual use of the land for energy production and biodiversity conservation through the establishment of grasses and forbs planted among and between the photovoltaic solar arrays ('solar-pollinator habitat'). Land use can be reduced to the level of gas power by installing on buildings and other built up areas.

Harmful materials are used in the production of solar panels, but generally in small amounts. As of 2022, the environmental impact of perovskite is difficult to estimate, but there is some concern that lead may be a problem.

A 2025 review of photovoltaic recycling identified cost-effectiveness, regulatory policies, and limited data availability as major challenges to recycling end-of-life solar panels, and highlighted the need for more efficient material separation and recovery technologies.

A 2021 International Energy Agency study projects the demand for copper will double by 2040. The study cautions that supply needs to increase rapidly to match demand from large-scale deployment of solar and required grid upgrades. More tellurium and indium may also be needed.

Recycling may help. As solar panels are sometimes replaced with more efficient panels, the second-hand panels are sometimes reused in developing countries, for example in Africa. Several countries have specific regulations for the recycling of solar panels. Although maintenance cost is already low compared to other energy sources, some academics have called for solar power systems to be designed to be more repairable.

Solar panels can increase local temperature. In large installation in the desert, the effect can be stronger than the urban heat island.

A very small proportion of solar power is concentrated solar power. Concentrated solar power may use much more water than gas-fired power. This can be a problem, as this type of solar power needs strong sunlight so is often built in deserts.

== Politics ==
Acceptance of wind and solar facilities in one's community is stronger among U.S. Democrats (blue), while acceptance of nuclear power plants is stronger among U.S. Republicans (red).

It has been argued that although the economic benefits of the energy transition to solar (and other clean energy) are so great that it cannot be stopped, slowing it would result in more climate damage. The fossil fuels lobby has been accused of delaying the transition. Fossil fuel subsidies are political, and impede the transition. Solar generation cannot be cut off by geopolitics once installed, unlike oil and gas, which contributes to energy security. And libertarians may favor it for reducing dependence on government, and reliance on inadequate electricity grids. However some right wing parties are opposed to or split on solar. Far-right party positions vary by country, with some opposing utility solar as part of their climate change denial. Although Green parties may favor solar as part of climate change mitigation some environmentalists oppose new power lines.

In 2022, over 40% of global polysilicon manufacturing capacity was in Xinjiang in China, which raises concerns about potential links to human rights violations in the region, including the Xinjiang re-education camps. According to the International Solar Energy Society (ISES), China's dominance of solar manufacturing does not pose the same type of supply risk as dependence on fossil fuels. ISES argues that the global solar manufacturing industry cannot grow to more than 400b USD per year and that, because solar panels are long-lasting, a disruption to Chinese supply would allow other countries sufficient time to develop alternative manufacturing capacity, although at higher costs. Businesses may lobby government for or against tariffs on panel imports.

== See also ==
- 100% renewable energy
- Cost of electricity by source
- Gravity battery
- Index of solar energy articles
- List of cities by sunshine duration
- List of photovoltaic power stations
- List of solar thermal power stations
- List of solar-powered products
- Renewable energy commercialization
- Solar energy
- Solar lamp
- Solar vehicle
- Sustainable energy
- Thin-film solar cell
- Timeline of solar cells

== Bibliography ==
- Perlin, John (1999). From space to Earth: the story of solar electricity. Earthscan. p. 50. ISBN 978-0-937948-14-9.
