= George Cove =

Canadian inventor

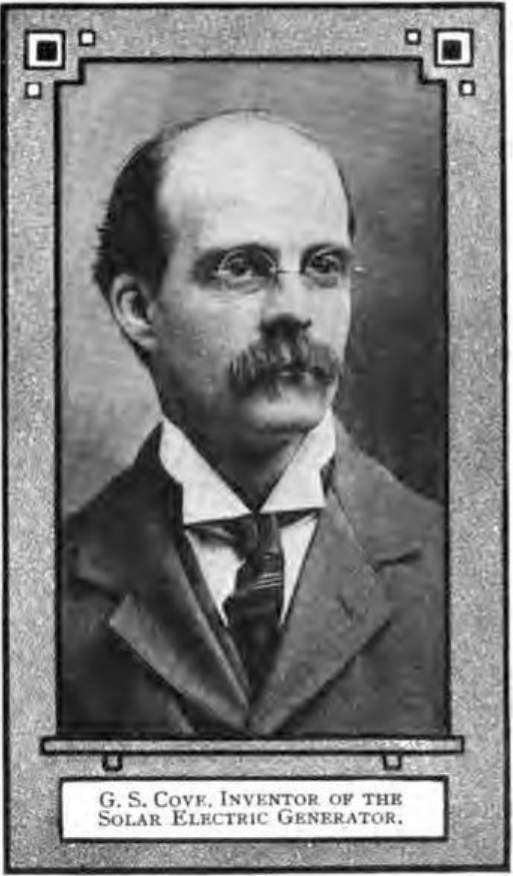
- Born: George H Cove; 1863 or 1864. Amherst, Nova Scotia
- Known for: Early photovoltaic technology

George Cove, as profiled in The Technical World Magazine, June 1909

Patent filed by George Cove, for "thermo electric battery and apparatus" filed in 1905

Canadian Patent 100247, "Tide Power System"

George Cove was a Canadian inventor, known primarily for early solar electric generation equipment.

== Biography ==
=== Early life ===
George Cove was born in Amherst, Nova Scotia, in 1863 or 1864. His father Joseph Cove patented many mechanical devices. His mother, Ann, was also born in Nova Scotia, and her parents were from Ireland.

=== Solar electric generator and kidnapping ===
In 1904–05, Cove developed his 'solar electric generator' which he displayed at the Metropole Building in Halifax, Nova Scotia. Word of this device reached American investors, and a plant to develop more devices was planned in Somerville, Massachusetts. In 1906, Cove patented a device for capturing tidal power for which he won a gold medal from the Canadian government for his model of the machine and a plan for harnessing the tides of the Bay of Fundy. In 1909–10, Cove maintained a workshop in New York at 118 Maiden Lane to manufacture solar electric generators. By July 1911, Cove had raised 5 million dollars from investors.

In 1909, Cove was kidnapped and offered $25,000 and a house to stop promoting his devices. He refused and was released at the Bronx Zoo. Cove accused a former investor, Frederick W. Huestis of organizing the kidnapping. Critics of Cove accused him of having staged the kidnapping for publicity, also accusing him of having raised money from scam investors and suggesting that the generator did not actually generate electricity, but was rather fed from the building's regular electric network. After the alleged kidnapping, being convicted and spending a year in prison, the business shuttered.

== Legacy ==
It has been speculated that Cove may have invented a photovoltaic panel 40 years before Bell Labs did in 1950. Sugandha Srivastav of the University of Oxford has noted that the use of fossil fuels grew significantly across the globe in those forty years, arguing that "avoiding a 40 year break in solar power’s development could have spared the world huge amounts of carbon emissions." However, John Perlin of the University of California has argued that Cove's generator "offered nothing new" and "led to a technological cul-de-sac."

== See also ==
- Timeline of solar energy
- Charles Fritts
