= Charles Fritts =

American inventor

Charles Fritz
- Born: 1850; Boston, Massachusetts
- Died: 1903 (aged 52–53)
- Occupations: Inventor, engineer

Charles Fritts (1850 – 1903) was an American inventor credited with creating the first working selenium cell in 1883.

According to CleanTechnica, the world's first rooftop solar array, using Fritts' selenium cells, was installed in 1884 on a New York City rooftop. Bellingcat attributes a photo of the cells to the roof of George Cove's laboratory.

Fritts coated the semiconductor material selenium with an extremely thin layer of gold. The resulting cells had a conversion electrical efficiency of about 1% owing to the properties of selenium given the material's cost, was too low to economically use such cells. Selenium cells found other applications including as light sensors for exposure timing in photo cameras, where they were common into the 1960s.

Solar cells later became practical for power uses after Russell Ohl's 1941 development of silicon P/N junction cells that reached efficiencies above 5% by the 1950s/1960s.

By 2006 the best silicon solar cells were over 40% efficient, with the industrial average over 17%. By 2022, the average efficiency of crystalline Silicon was 21%.

== See also ==
- Timeline of solar energy
- George Cove
