= Calvin Souther Fuller =

American chemist (1902–1994)

- Born: May 25, 1902
- Died: October 28, 1994 (aged 92); Vero Beach, Florida
- Citizenship: United States
- Education: University of Chicago, PhD
- Known for: Invention of the solar cell
- Awards: Elected to US National Inventors Hall of Fame, May 2, 2008, for invention of the "Silicon Solar Cell" along with Daryl Chapin and Gerald Pearson. Elected to New Jersey Inventors Hall of Fame, June 22, 2006, for Development of the Semiconductor Photovoltaic Solar Cell. Winner of Alfred Krupp Award, Heidelberg University, Germany. Received the John Price Wetherill Medal in 1963.
- Scientific career
- Fields: Physical Chemistry
- Workplaces: AT&T Bell Laboratories

Calvin Souther Fuller (May 25, 1902 – October 28, 1994) was an American physical chemist at AT&T Bell Laboratories where he worked for 37 years from 1930 to 1967. Fuller was part of a team in basic research that found answers to physical challenges. He helped develop synthetic rubber during World War II, he was involved in early experiments of zone melting, he is credited with devising the method of transistor production yielding diffusion transistors, he produced some of the first solar cells with high efficiency, and he researched polymers and their applications.

== Early life ==
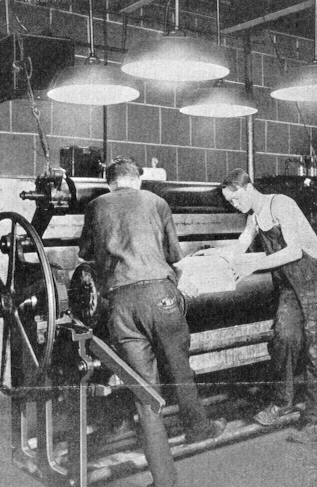
Calvin Souther Fuller at work (left) at a printing press as a teenager at the end of World War I.

Calvin Fuller was born in Chicago 25 May 1902 to Julius Quincy and Bessie Souther Fuller. Studying chemistry at the University of Chicago, he received his B.S. in 1926, and working with William Draper Harkins, earned a Ph.D. degree in 1929.

From 1920 to 1922 he worked for the General Chemical Company, and from 1924 to 1930 for the Chicago Tribune. In 1930 he moved to Murray Hill, New Jersey, to take up a position as physical chemist for Bell Labs. On 17 September 1932 he married Willimine Works.

In August 1942 Fuller became part of the effort to develop synthetic rubber as the supply of natural rubber was cut off by the Japanese. He travelled widely in the USA representing the Office of Rubber Reserve in the Reconstruction Finance Corporation. The effort involved several academic and industrial laboratories as well as scientists W.O. Baker and J.H. Heiss of Bell Labs. In 16 months they were able to begin production of Government Rubber-Styrene. Fuller and Baker developed methods to perfect the chemical process for large scale manufacturing. There were 700,000 tons of the synthetic rubber produced in 1945.

== Solar battery ==
Working with Bell Telephone scientists Daryl Chapin and Gerald Pearson, Fuller diffused boron into silicon to capture the Sun's power. In doing so, they created the first practical means of collecting energy from the Sun and turning it into a current of electricity. The invention of the solar battery resulted in a 600% improvement in the ability to harness the Sun's power into electricity. First, Fuller ensured that silicon was uncorrupted and pure. Then Fuller accomplished the diffusion of boron into silicon. The inventors used several small strips of silicon to capture sunlight and render it into free electrons. Bell Laboratories, who had funded the research, announced the prototype manufacture of a new solar battery.

Robert W. Fuller, Calvin S. Fuller's oldest son, tells the following story: "In 1954 I was home from vacation from college to visit my parents. That night my father, Calvin Souther Fuller, came home with something that looked like a quarter with wires sticking out of it. This was a device that connected to a small electric windmill that stood on the table. He shined a bright flashlight on the quarter-like object, which was actually silicon solar cell, and the blades of the windmill started turning. It was so exciting to see the flashlight power the tiny windmill. While this device looked like a quarter to anyone else, it was actually the world's first silicon solar battery - a device that later become known as the silicon solar cell."

The first public service trial of the Bell Solar Battery began with a telephone carrier system in 1955 in Americus, Georgia. By 1958, the US Department of Defense realized an extremely valuable application of this device as it deployed self-sufficient, power to vehicles and satellites in space.

== Polymers ==
Fuller did basic research on polymers at Bell Labs. He studied how the bonds of the mers determined elasticity and tensile strength. Extending the work of Carothers at Du Pont, he investigated the condensation polymers polyester and polyamide.

Bell was seeking an ideal insulator to use in coaxial cables which would be effective for high frequency operation. Realizing that polyethylene was free of polar groups, Fuller produced some of the first cable with this now common insulator.

== Personal life ==
Fuller was married to Willmine Fuller. They had three children, Robert W. Fuller, Stephen Fuller, and John Fuller and eight grandchildren. Fuller moved to Vero Beach, Florida when he reached age 65 and was subject to mandatory retirement from Bell Labs. In retirement he acquired an Airstream RV and traveled widely in the US with Willmine. In 1994 Fuller died in Vero Beach, Florida, at age 92. According to stories told by Calvin's son Robert Fuller to his grandson, Ben Fuller, Calvin Fuller's hobbies included cultivating large red homegrown tomatoes in his New Jersey garden, photography of family and landscape images, and being capable of performing a wide range of home repairs and home improvements.
