= Daryl Chapin =

American physicist

Daryl Muscott Chapin
- Born: July 21, 1906; Ellensburg, Washington, US
- Died: January 19, 1995 (aged 88); Naples, Florida, US
- Education: Willamette University; University of Washington
- Known for: Co-inventing the solar cell
- Scientific career
- Fields: Physics
- Workplaces: Bell Labs

Daryl Muscott Chapin (21 July 1906 – 19 January 1995) was an American physicist, best known for co-inventing solar cells in 1954 during his work at Bell Labs alongside Calvin S. Fuller and Gerald Pearson. For this, he was inducted into the National Inventors Hall of Fame in 2008.

== Biography ==
Chapin was born in Ellensburg, Washington on 21 July 1906, although he spent his childhood in Salem, Oregon. There, he obtained his bachelor's degree from Willamette University and later on received his master's from the University of Washington. Before joining AT&T in 1930, he lectured physics at Oregon State College for a year.

Prior to working on solar cells, he worked on magnetic materials. While working on power sources for remote telephone systems in humid areas such as the tropics, where dry cell batteries are unreliable, he investigated solar power as an energy source after considering alternatives like thermoelectric generators and small steam engines. Initially he investigated selenium, getting efficiencies which were too low with a yield of about 4.9 watts per square meter.

At the same time, Pearson and Fuller were working on altering semiconductor properties through introduction of impurities. They created a p–n junction by dipping a gallium-doped silicon piece in lithium at around 500 °C before exposing it to sunlight, hence discovering its ability to generate photocurrents. Pearson informed Chapin of this discovery, prompting him to switch materials and after a year the functional solar cell was demonstrated on 25 April 1954. The solar cells delivered a power of about 60 watts per square meter, for an efficiency of 6 percent, and was patented as a "solar energy converting apparatus".

The initial discovery attracted major media attention, with the New York Times reporting the discovery on its first page as one which "may mark the beginning of a new era, leading eventually to the realization of one of mankind’s most cherished dreams–the harnessing of the almost limitless energy of the sun for the uses of civilization". It initially failed to gain major commercialization due to its still-prohibitive costs and found only niche use in small electronic devices such as the transistor radio. However, the Pentagon found use of the technology for their satellites and in 1958 launched the Vanguard 1, the first solar-powered satellite.

For the discovery, Chapin was awarded an honorary doctorate by his alma mater, Willamette, and the John Scott Medal from Philadelphia, both in 1956. By 1959, he had simplified the solar cell's experiment to the point where it was performed by high school students across the United States. In order to bring down the cost, he experimented with polycrystalline silicon but was unable to reproduce the efficiencies of the single crystals. He died in his home in Naples, Florida on 19 January 1995, at age 88. After his death, he was inducted into the National Inventors Hall of Fame in 2008 alongside his two co-workers.
