= Gerald Pearson =

American physicist (1905–1987)

Gerald L. Pearson (March 31, 1905 – October 25, 1987) was an American physicist whose work on silicon rectifiers at Bell Labs led to the invention of the solar cell. In 2008, he was inducted into the National Inventors Hall of Fame.

== Biography ==
Pearson was born in Salem, Oregon. He took a bachelor's degree in mathematics and physics from Willamette University and a master's degree in physics from Stanford University. From 1929 he worked as a research physicist at Bell Labs and his early work on temperature-sensitive resistors led to 13 patents on thermistors. After World War II he was part of William Shockley's group, where his experimental results were essential in developing models of semiconductor behaviour. In 1946, acting on a suggestion by Shockley he put a voltage on a droplet of glycol borate (gu) placed across a P-N junction producing the first evidence of power amplification in the search for the transistor.

In 1954 his work on silicon rectifiers led to the first practical photovoltaic cell (solar cell), together with Daryl Chapin and Calvin Souther Fuller.

He took early retirement from Bell in 1960 to take up the position of professor of electrical engineering at Stanford setting up a research program on compound semiconductors.

== Awards and honors ==
In 1964, Pearson received the Golden Plate Award of the American Academy of Achievement.
