= Russell Ohl =

American engineer

Russell Shoemaker Ohl
- Born: January 30, 1898; Allentown, Pennsylvania, United States
- Died: March 20, 1987 (aged 89); Vista, California, United States
- Scientific career
- Fields: Engineering
- Workplaces: Bell Laboratories; Pennsylvania State University

Russell Shoemaker Ohl (January 30, 1898 – March 20, 1987) was an American scientist who is generally recognized for patenting the modern solar cell (U.S. patent 2,402,662, "Light sensitive device"). Ohl was a notable semiconductor researcher prior to the invention of the transistor. He was also known as R.S. Ohl.

== Semiconductor research ==
Russell Ohl's specialized area of research was into the behavior of certain types of crystals. He worked on materials research in the 1930s at AT&T's Bell Labs’ Holmdel facility, investigating diode detectors suitable for high-frequency Wireless, broadcasting, and military radar. His work was only understood by a handful of scientists in the organization, one of whom was Dr. Walter Brattain (one of the trio who invented the germanium bipolar transistor in 1947, and who would be awarded the Nobel Prize for Physics in 1956).

In 1939 Ohl discovered the PN barrier (or as it became known, the “P–N junction”). At the time hardly anyone knew anything about the impurities within these crystals, but Ohl discovered the mechanism by which it worked. The impurities made some sections more resistant to electrical flow than others, and this "barrier" between these areas of different purity that made the crystal work. Ohl later found that super-purifying germanium was the key to making repeatable and usable semiconductor material for diodes. All diodes (incl. LEDs, laser diodes etc.) are descendants of Ohl's work. His work with diodes led him later to develop the first silicon solar cells.

== See also ==
- Battery
- Solar cell
- Transistor
