= Climate change in Papua New Guinea =

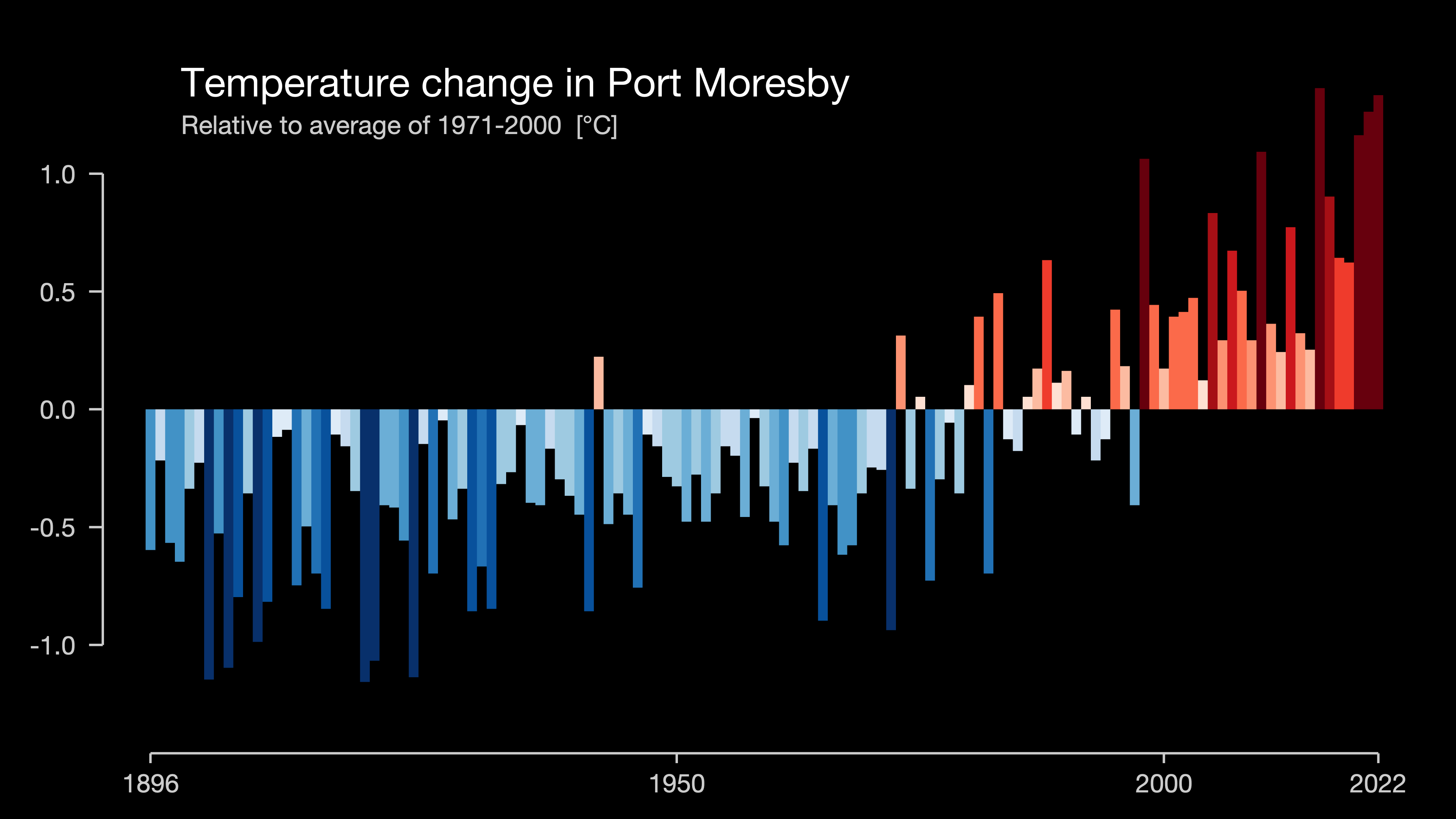
Temperatures in the capital Port Moresby have increased, especially in the 21st century

Papua New Guinea is highly vulnerable to climate change. Much of the country is already at high risk of natural disasters, and changes in the climate are expected to exacerbate disasters such as floods, heat waves, and landslides. Warming temperatures are expected to reduce crop yields, which would negatively impact the large proportion of the population that relies on subsistence agriculture. Sea level rise may make some coastal and island areas uninhabitable, while an increase in sea temperature and acidity may make the already warm tropical waters unsuitable for coral reefs, substantially impacting local fisheries.

Due to its extensive forests, the country was a net carbon sink at the turn of the century. However, changes in land use, land-use change, and forestry reduced the amount of absorbed carbon, and by 2015 the country was a net emitter. Most emissions come from the growing energy sector, and emissions from transport are increasing. Efforts to reduce emissions have focused on expanding electrical grids and increasing the input of renewable energy or other low-carbon energy sources into these grids.

The government has integrated climate change considerations into its policy planning. However, the capacity of the country to respond to the impacts of climate change is limited. Internationally, the country is a proponent of reducing emissions from deforestation and forest degradation. It has been active in climate change negotiations, and has committed under the Paris Agreement to become carbon neutral by 2050.

== Impacts ==
Average temperatures are thought to have already increased 0.8–0.9 °C (1.4–1.6 °F) compared to the start of the 20th century. Further increases are expected to be higher for inland areas. Overall, land temperatures are expected to increase 0.4 °C (0.72 °F) more than sea surface temperatures. While current temperatures are generally stable, climate change brings the risk of heat waves, which would see large increases in the number of days over 35 °C (95 °F). This will increase heat-related deaths, and diseases such as malaria may become more widespread, especially as it becomes more common in the densely populated Highlands Region. Alpine forests are expected to contract, although lower-elevation environments may benefit. Electricity demand for cooling is expected to increase, especially in urban areas. The annual cost of climate change is estimated to be near USD 8 million.

Agriculture continues to play a key role in the livelihood of much of the population. Most agricultural produce is grown for immediate consumption rather than storage, leaving the community susceptible to short-term damage such as droughts and frosts, which can threaten their food security. Sweet potato yields may decline by 10% by 2050 due to changing climatic conditions, and other crops will see similar declines. In high-emission scenarios, this is projected to result in 28.3 deaths per million people by 2050. Ocean acidification and temperature rise are expected to make most of the country's waters unsuitable for coral reefs. This will likely threaten the country's fisheries.

=== Natural disasters ===
Papua New Guinea is one of the 10 most at-risk countries for natural disasters and is vulnerable to changes in climate. Changes in temperature and rainfall are thought to have already exacerbated some of these disasters, including heat waves, landslides, and flooding, while also increasing the occurrence of storms, disease, and drought. These impacts are felt both in inland regions and along the coasts and islands. Around 18% of the country faces the risk of flooding, which affects around 22,000 people each year, of which 6,000 are displaced. The 2008 Papua New Guinea floods were caused by high ocean swells, likely produced by a combination of sea level rise and the El Niño–Southern Oscillation. Rainfall also causes landslides; the May 2024 Enga landslide buried 2000 people.

Rainfall will increase both overall and in the number of intense storms. Due to the number of interacting factors that cause droughts, it is not well understood whether they are likely to increase or decrease in frequency and intensity. However, it is expected that flooding will impact more people and cause greater levels of damage, with currently one-in-a-hundred-year events doubling or quadrupling in frequency. Higher rainfall intensity will also increase landslide risk, and decrease drinking water quality. Cyclones are expected to be less frequent, but more intense.

=== Sea level rise ===
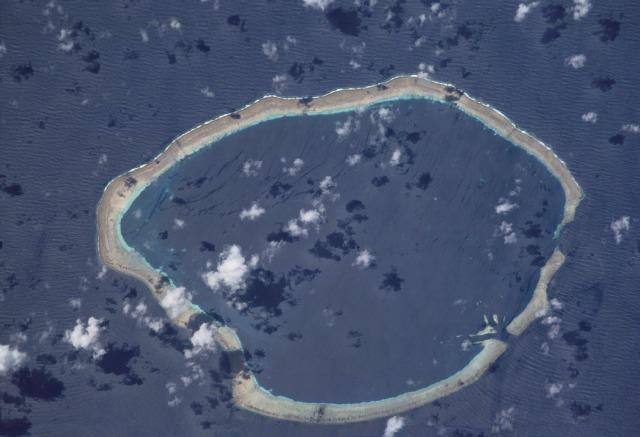
The Carteret Islands are viewed as an international example of climate change risk, as sea level rise is expected to render the islands uninhabitable.

Sea level rise in the South Pacific is expected to be greater than the global average. One rough estimate suggests around 40,000 people in Papua New Guinea will be permanently displaced by coastline changes. Mangrove forests on the north coast are also threatened by this change. The Carteret Islands in Bougainville are well known as an example of an area at risk of becoming uninhabitable due to rising sea levels. The islands' inhabitants are seen at risk of becoming "climate change refugees". These islands are part of a single atoll. By the 1980s, Huene Island had already effectively been split into multiple parts. Sea level rise is likely behind the degradation of the islands' habitability, although this impact is mixed with that of tectonic lift, local destruction of mangroves and coral reefs, and population growth. A resettlement scheme was first mooted in the late 1960s, and an Atolls Resettlement Committee was created by the Bougainville provincial government in 1982. The first 10 families were resettled in August 1984, however most returned to the islands following the eruption of the Bougainville conflict.

In 2006, the local council of elders held meetings on how to manage rising sea levels and storm surges. This meeting resulted in the creation of an NGO, Tulele Peisa, intended to help facilitate voluntary resettlement elsewhere in Bougainville. The name means "sailing the waves on our own" in the Halia language. In 2010 Papua New Guinea released four postage stamps featuring the Carteret Islands to highlight the issue of climate change. Resettlement is unaffordable for most islanders, although Tulele Peisa has received support from the Catholic Church, which has donated land for 30 families on mainland Bougainville. The remaining residents rely on food provided by the government, as the islands are no longer able to support sufficient agriculture. Fishing is also more difficult, as fewer fish are found in the overheated coral reefs nearby. Some early predictions estimated the islands might become submerged by 2015, as initial resettlements were thought to be among the first related to climate change in the world. Attempts to safeguard the land through seawalls and mangroves have likely delayed, but not prevented, the loss of the islands. Large king tides have fully submerged the islands at times. As of December 2021, 3,400 people from four communities on these islands were heavily impacted by sea level rise. The provincial government has made plans to resettle more families, but these have been delayed.

== Emissions ==
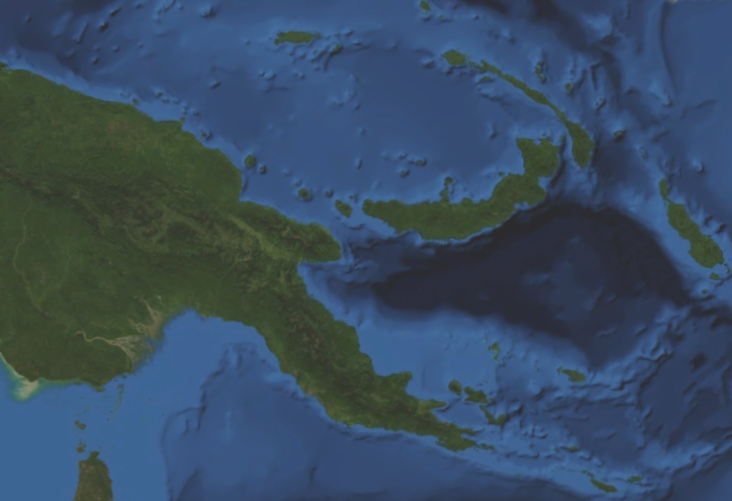
The forests of Papua New Guinea once meant the country was a net carbon sink

As of 2000, Papua New Guinea was a net sink of greenhouse gases, absorbing 14,179 billion g of CO_{2} equivalent emissions more than it produced. As of 2015, the country was a net emitter, with a net 15,193 billion g CO_{2} equivalent emissions produced. The largest producer of emissions in 2015 was the energy sector (11,806.28 billion g CO_{2} eq), from which 35% of the emissions produced were from the industry, 27% from natural gas leaks, and 17% from transport. The waste sector produced 872.5 billion g CO_{2}, 70.6% from water treatment and 28.7% from solid waste. Agriculture produced 796 billion g CO_{2} eq, 58% of which was due to emissions from soils, and 41% from manure and fermentation. Industrial processes produced 35.29 billion g CO_{2}: 58% from medical N2O use and 42% from lubricant use.

The main change from 2000 to 2015 was in the land use, land-use change, and forestry sector (LULUCF), which shifted from absorbing 21,635.94 billion g CO_{2} eq in 2000 to a net production of 1,716.46 billion g CO_{2} eq in 2015. Increasing population and urbanisation have caused a small increase in waste-related emissions.

As of 2015, most greenhouse gas emissions were carbon dioxide (59.8%), which was followed by methane (35.2%) and nitrous oxide (4.9%). Since 2000, carbon dioxide production has increased more than methane production due to the growth of the energy sector. From this sector, most emissions come from electricity generation. This showed a small increase from 2000 to 2004, after which it was mostly stable until LNG production in 2015 created a substantial increase in electricity demand. Emissions from transport have increased over time, whereas manufacturing and industry has remained mostly constant. Around half of the country's electricity comes from petroleum products, while much of the rest is from natural gas. The main renewable power source is hydropower.

=== Mitigation ===
As of 2018, there were six large-scale emission reduction projects in the country, most of which sought to generate electricity from alternative sources such as geothermal power and methane capture. There are plans to extend the Gazelle Peninsula grid to other areas of West New Britain Province, and geothermal input into this grid is aimed to be expanded. There are also intentions to increase hydropower input, as well as other renewable energy sources, into the Port Moresby and Ramu grids.

The private company Oil Search pledged in 2016 to reduce its emissions to a third of its 2009 levels. The New Britain Palm Oil company has explored ways to convert oil palm waste into electricity.

== Policy ==
Climate change is regarded as a security risk, as it exacerbates the already common natural disasters that the country lacks sufficient capacity to respond to effectively. Internationally, the country is considered to have one of the lowest capacities to cope with climate-related natural hazards. Of the predicted impacts of climate change, the government views sea level rise and the loss of low-lying land as the most important priority. This is followed by an increase in extreme weather events and rainfall changes. Climate change is considered an area of joint security concern by Australia and Papua New Guinea. Between 2015 and 2018, Australia contributed AUD 115 million towards climate change-related projects in Papua New Guinea.

Provincial disaster response offices are not able to effectively respond to climate change events. Poor infrastructure hampers responses, especially in very rural areas. Almost all land being customary land makes obtaining land for internal resettlement difficult. Establishing early warning systems for floods has been the focus of a number of projects along large river systems and coasts. The awareness of climate change among the population is limited, and a lack of access to communications means that much of the population is unable to receive weather forecasts. Climate change is one factor in increasing levels of internal displacement within Papua New Guinea.

=== Government strategies ===
Climate change is recognised as a high priority for the government, and is included in long-term planning documents such as Vision 2050 and the National Strategy for Responsible Sustainable Development. A National Action Plan has been created for the years 2022–2030, which aims to integrate climate change action throughout government policy. Vision 2050 was developed in 2010, alongside the PNG Development Strategic Plan (DSP) 2010–2030, the latter of which is divided into 5-year medium term plans. The National Strategy for Responsible Sustainable Development (StaRS) was developed in 2012. These include climate change as a consideration for sustainable development, and the StaRS includes a green growth plan.

The Office of Climate Change and Development was created in 2010. In the 2011 Peter O'Neill cabinet, Belden Namah was appointed deputy prime minister, and was given the ministerial portfolio covering forestry and climate change. Namah declared climate change would be a political priority for his Papua New Guinea Party, supporting the work of Papua New Guinea's climate change ambassador Kevin Conrad, and seeking for local scientists to benefit from climate change-related research funding.

The Office of Climate Change and Development created the National Climate Compatible Development Management Policy (NCCDMP), which was endorsed by the national government in 2014. The NCCDMP created a framework for emission mitigation. As part of this, a National REDD+ Strategy was created for 2017–2027 aiming to improve land-use planning, environmental management, and sustainable livelihoods. The NCCDMP targets becoming carbon neutral in 2050, and is in line with the regional Framework for Resilient Development in the Pacific.

The Climate Change (Management) Act was then passed in 2015, creating a Climate Change and Development Authority (CCDA), tasked with creating a low-carbon economy. The Paris Agreement (Implementation) Act was passed in 2016, following the creation of the international Paris Agreement. The CCDA is responsible for undertaking Papua New Guinea's responsibilities to the UNFCCC and the Paris Agreement, and more broadly promoting climate-compatible growth. As part of its nationally determined contribution, submitted in 2016, the government pledged that all of the country's electricity would be produced from renewables by 2030, conditional on financial and technical assistance. Full carbon neutrality is targeted for 2050.

=== International negotiations ===
I would ask the United States, we ask for your leadership. But if for some reason you're not willing to lead, leave it to the rest of us. Please get out of the way.

— Kevin Conrad, December 2007

At the December 2007 United Nations Climate Change Conference in Bali, Papua New Guinea's representative Kevin Conrad gained international attention after he called on the United States to "get out of the way" of reaching a resolution. Shortly afterward, the attending countries reached a consensus. Conrad later stated that the impression that the United States was the blocker was mistaken, and that it overshadowed complex disagreements within developing countries. Papua New Guinea sought to include some form of payments for preserving tropical forests in these negotiations. These talks resulted in the Bali Road Map.

Papua New Guinea signed the United Nations Framework Convention on Climate Change in 1992 and ratified it in 1993, becoming a Non-Annex I country. It signed the Kyoto Protocol in 1997, ratifying it in 2000. The country is a party to the Kigali Amendment, which is actioned domestically through the Environment (Ozone Depleting Substances) Regulation 2007 and later legislation. As part of international negotiations around the 2009 Copenhagen Accord, the government pledged for its greenhouse gas emissions to be cut in half by 2030, and for the country to become carbon neutral by 2050. It signed the Paris Agreement in 2015.

Papua New Guinea was a founding member of the Coalition for Rainforest Nations in 2005, and together with Costa Rica led on the concept of reducing deforestation emissions. From that year it has continued international participation regarding reducing emissions from deforestation and forest degradation.

== See also ==
- Deforestation in Papua New Guinea
- Conservation in Papua New Guinea
