= Heroes of the Environment (2008) =

Topic of Time Magazine special issue

Heroes of the Environment is a list published in Time magazine. After the inaugural list of 2007, the next list was published in September 2008. The list contains 30 entries, individuals or groups that have contributed substantially to the preservation of environment, and is divided into four categories: Leaders & Visionaries, Moguls & Entrepreneurs, Activists and Scientists & Innovators.

== Leaders and visionaries ==
- Kevin Conrad
- Arnold Schwarzenegger
- Sheila Watt-Cloutier
- Alice Waters
- Marina Silva and Cristina Narbona Ruiz
- Kim Stanley Robinson
- Michael Shellenberger and Ted Nordhaus
- Habiba Sarabi
- Bharrat Jagdeo

== Moguls & Entrepreneurs ==
- Jean-François Decaux and Jean-Charles Decaux (billionaire father, Jean-Claude Decaux)
- Mick Bremans
- John Doerr
- Peter Head
- Peggy Liu
- Shai Agassi

== Activists ==
- Annie Leonard
- Wang Yongchen
- Gidon Bromberg, Nader Al-Khateeb and Munqeth Mehyar
- Jack Sim
- Balbir Singh Seechewal
- Silas Kpanan'Ayoung Siakor
- Craig Sorley
- Marina Rikhvanova
- Van Jones

== Scientists & Innovators ==
- Soren Hermansen
- Lonnie Thompson
- Mohammed Dilawar
- Jurgenne Primavera
- Joachim Luther
- Vo Quy

== See also ==
- Environmental Media Awards
- Global 500 Roll of Honour
- Global Environmental Citizen Award
- Goldman Environmental Prize
- Grantham Prize for Excellence in Reporting on the Environment
- Presidential Environmental Youth Awards
- Tyler Prize for Environmental Achievement
- Nuclear-Free Future Award
