= Fisheries in Papua New Guinea =

Fisheries are an important source of sustenance for many communities in Papua New Guinea, as well as a source of exports and other economic benefits. The country has inland freshwater, coastal, and offshore fisheries, as well as an aquaculture sector. A large proportion of the population uses these for subsistence fishing, with fish forming an important components of diets even in the inland Highlands Region. Subsistence coastal fishing catches a wide variety of fish and invertebrates, reflecting the high biodiversity of the country's waters. Inland subsistence fisheries have traditionally focused on eels, although introduced species are now also caught.

The commercial fishing industry has developed over time, with notable industries including tuna capture and processing and a shrimp fishery. The tuna industry includes both foreign and domestic vessels, with some catches processed locally and some exported. Access fees for foreign tuna fishing vessels provide over 1% of the national budget. The shrimp fishery is locally owned and operated, with most trawling taking place in the Gulf of Papua. Coastal commercial fishing mostly produces dried products, with attempts to create chilled or frozen coastal industries unsuccessful. The country has some aquaculture, often carried out in small-scale settings where it complements other food sources. Most fisheries are thought to be harvested sustainably.

The management of fisheries is the responsibility of the National Fisheries Authority (NFA). This body has created a number of management plans that seek to ensure fisheries are used sustainably. The government has sought to bolster the fishing sector over time, including by having more catch processed domestically. While the NFA regulates commercial fisheries, it does not regulate subsistence fishing. Coastal communities have traditional ownership of reefs and seabed, and may reject external management. Internationally, Papua New Guinea is part of the Western and Central Pacific Fisheries Commission and the Nauru Agreement. The Torres Strait Treaty governs shared management of the Torres Strait with Australia.

== Resources ==
Papua New Guinea and its islands encompass a large area of territorial sea, surrounded by the country's exclusive economic zone

The total fisheries area within Papua New Guinean waters is 2,400,000 square kilometres (930,000 sq mi). This is the largest single fisheries area in the South Pacific. The country's exclusive economic zone covers 3,120,000 square kilometres (1,200,000 sq mi), extending from a 17,000-kilometre (11,000 mi) coastline. The continental shelf covers around 186,819 square kilometres (72,131 sq mi). Its waters border those of Australia, Indonesia, Palau, and the Solomon Islands.

Broadly, fisheries can be divided into freshwater, coastal, offshore, and aquaculture. The coastal fishery can be further divided into subsistence and commercial, while the offshore fishery can be divided between local and foreign operations. Specific fisheries include river fisheries, coastal sea cucumber harvesting, coral reef fisheries, a shrimp fishery, and a tuna fishery. The shrimp fishery (usually trawling) and some of the tuna fishery (usually using longline fishing) is domestic, while deep-sea purse seine fishing is undertaken by international fleets.

Small-scale fishing takes various forms across the highly diverse landscape, using handlines, spears, and nets. Such fishing is common in coastal reefs, and in large freshwater rivers. Invertebrate harvesting, including of lobsters and sea cucumbers, may be more common than fin fishing. Most coastal fishing is subsistence fishing, and some of the remainder is for local sale. Fishing often requires extensive local knowledge, despite using simple gear. Locally produced fish that is not eaten shortly after being caught is salted or dried. Inland fisheries are crucial for the large proportion of the population without access to the sea. Traditionally, eels are fished from rivers, although foreign species have been introduced into rivers and are now caught. Some estimates find that half of those living in the Highlands Region engage in some form of freshwater subsistence fishing.

The most common tuna catches are albacore and yellowfin tuna, with smaller catches of skipjack tuna and bigeye tuna. The shrimp fishery mostly catches banana prawn and giant tiger prawn. Coastal fishery catch is highly varied, reflecting the significant biodiversity of these waters. Some species, including some mullet, are found both in rivers and the ocean. Coastal fishing can be divided into demersal fishing, nearshore pelagic fishing, invertebrate gleaning, and invertebrate collection for export. Nearshore pelagic fish include wahoo, mackerel, rainbow runner, and mahi-mahi, as well as tuna. Coral reef fish known to be hunted include wrasse, groupers, emperor fish, bream, sea perch and fusiliers, parrotfish, sweetlips, butterflybream and monocle bream, squirrelfish, drummers, moray eels, triggerfish, rabbitfish, surgeonfish and unicornfish, and goatfish. Fish species that swim above coral reefs include trevallies, mullet, and barracuda. Invertebrates include sea cucumbers, lobsters, trochus, giant clams, crabs, octopuses, and green snails. Seaweed is harvested during subsistence fishing.

Aquaculture, freshwater fishing, and coastal fishing are not consistently tracked by the government. Estimated outputs substantially vary. It is thought that there is some coastal overfishing near urban areas. Recreational fishing is mostly limited to urban areas, and focuses on oceanic fish like tuna. There is some riverine fishing of Lutjanus goldiei. Fish aggregating devices can be used for recreational fishing, as well as subsistence fishing.

== Industry ==
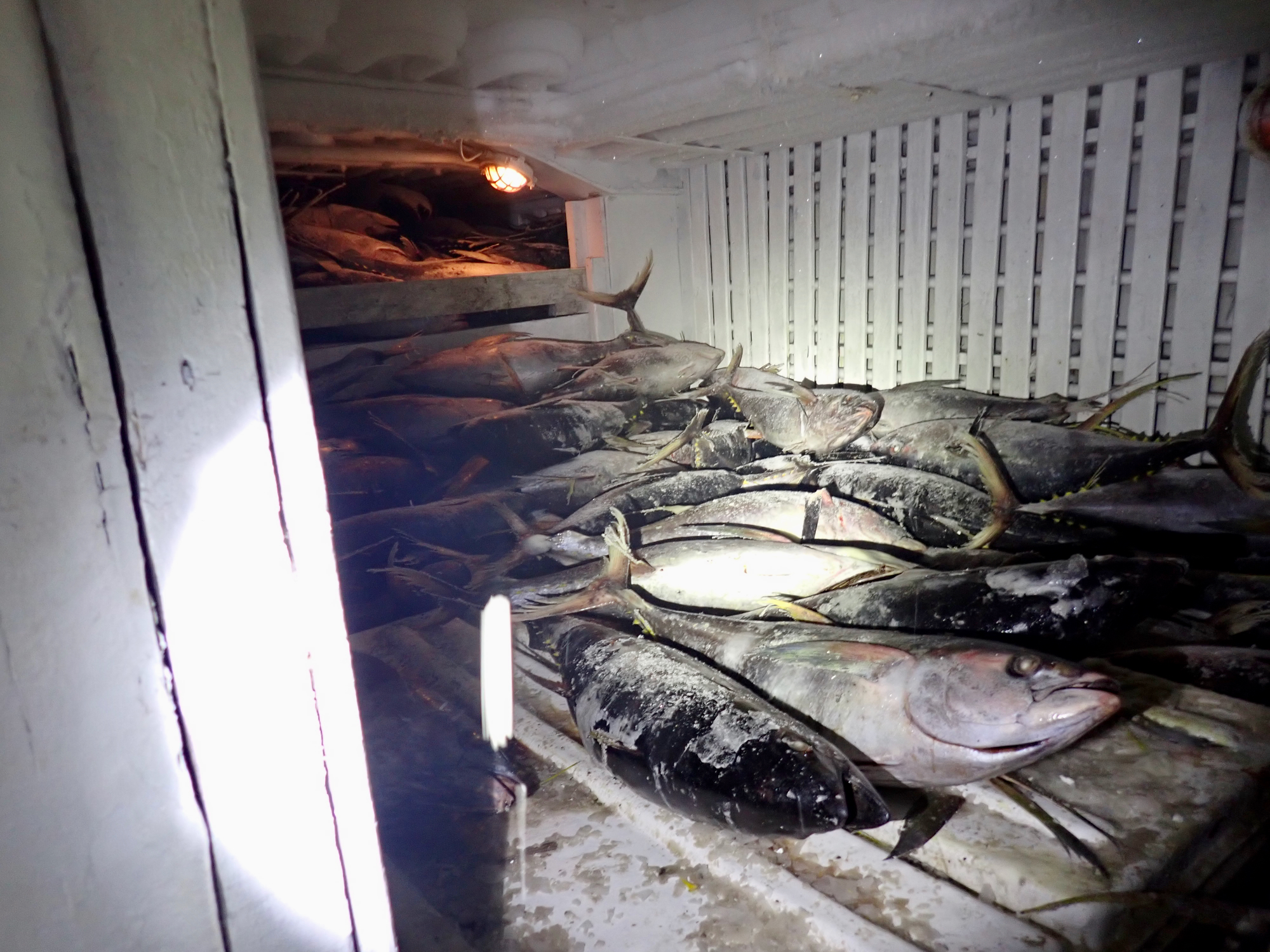
Tuna caught in Papua New Guinean waters

The waters of Papua New Guinea produce 14% of global tuna, worth between US$99 million to US$114 million per year. There is a small domestic tuna canning industry. The four tuna species caught are albacore, skipjack tuna, yellowfin tuna, and bigeye tuna. The populations in Papua New Guinean waters are part of the wider western and central Pacific tuna population. Longliners also sometimes catch black marlin, blue marlin, striped marlin, swordfish, blue sharks, silky sharks, mako sharks, thresher sharks, among other species. Access fees paid to the government by foreign tuna fishers totaled US$44 million in 2013 and US$85 million in 2014, meaning they provided 1.7% of all government revenue in 2014.

In 2016, tuna made up 94% of the 309,000 metric tonnes produced by capture fisheries, including tuna caught by both longline and purse seine fishing. Longliners fish only within Papua New Guinean waters, while purse seiners spend a minority of their time outside of these waters. There is a small amount of offshore handline fishing as well. Inland fisheries produced an estimated 13,500 tonnes. Aquaculture produced 2,200 tonnes, mostly pond-grown tilapia and common carp. As of 1990, around 10,400 people were thought to work in marine capture fisheries. As of 2010, the fishing fleet was around 620 vessels. As of 2016, there were 53 purse seiners and 20 longliners. Fisheries exports totalled 168,874 tonnes in 2022. Exports of tuna to the European Union (EU) are duty free. Following the change to duty-free status, almost all processed tuna is now shipped to the EU, whereas before most was shipped to the United States. Overall fishery exports are about US$255 million per year, most of which is tuna. In 2016, imports were worth US$46.5 million (that year exports were US$197 million). In 2014, the sector as a whole was worth US$16.85 billion, or 1.7% of GDP.

Shrimp trawling generally takes place off the southern coast, especially within the Gulf of Papua. As of 2012, the Gulf of Papua prawn fishery was fished by seven domestic companies with a total of 15 ships. There is also a Panulirus ornatus lobster fishery in the Torres Strait. While coastal fishing is mostly for subsistence or local sale, exceptions are sea cucumbers, lobsters, and Trochus, which are harvested for export. Coastal fisheries have generally produced dried products. There have been multiple attempts to generate chilled or frozen food industries, but they have never proved economical. A small amount goes to the live fish trade.

Longline tuna fishing ships and shrimp trawlers generally offload their catch in Port Moresby, from where export is relatively simple. The offloading of smaller-scale fishing is often local, and foreign ships tend to export via transshipment or by sailing to foreign ports. The highest quality tuna is usually shipped to Japan. Canneries in Papua New Guinea, the Philippines, American Samoa, and parts of Asia receive lower grade tuna. Domestic processing usually occurs in Lae, Madang, and Wewak, which are closer to tuna fisheries than Port Moresby. Tuna-processing facilities are owned by Malaysian, Philippine, Taiwanese, Thai, and local companies and institutions. Domestic tuna facilities are often foreign-owned. However, many tuna and shrimp fishing boats are owned and operated by locals.

While most inland fishing is for sustenance, small amounts of barramundi and bass have been caught commercially in southern rivers, and some riverine prawns are harvested. The barramundi fishery began in Western Province in the late 1960s, but declined in the 1990s. A management plan is in place to ensure the stock recovers. Imported species introduced into rivers include tilapia, Java barb, and rainbow trout. Estimating total catch is tricky, although one 2014 estimate put it at 20,000 tonnes worth US$38 million. The lobster fishery in Daru, Western Province has licensed boats and dedicated freezer boats.

There is some aquaculture, with fish ponds sometimes used to supplement crops and other farm animals. The first aquaculture promotion occurred in 1954. The Highlands Aquaculture Development Centre, located in Aiyura, Eastern Highlands Province, distributes common carp to farmers. Private suppliers distribute rainbow trout. The most commonly farmed fish is thought to be tilapia, although estimates of its total production vary. There are some crocodile farms, and efforts have also been made to farm seaweed, trout, giant clams, barramundi, milkfish, mullet, mussels, oysters, giant tiger prawns, and pearls. An Inland Aquaculture and Fisheries Strategic Plan has been created, and aquaculture is mentioned in the national Vision 2050 plan.

== Impact ==
Fisheries produce an estimated K350 to K400 million per year, although this number is uncertain due to difficulties in valuing subsistence fishing, and fluctuations in the market rate of different fisheries products. This is perhaps 2.7% of GDP. Average domestic consumption is thought to be between 18.2 and 24.9 kilograms (40 and 55 lb) per year in 2021, up from 17.5 kilograms (39 lb) in 2013. On average, fish provides 1.7% of caloric intake, although consumption is higher in urban areas than rural ones. The "blood meat" of tuna is popular in domestic markets, where it is called Solomon Blue.

Subsistence fishing is important for rural incomes, where it is used to pay for needs such as school fees. Estimates in 1994 calculated that 30,000 tons were fished at small-scales. The 1990 census recorded that 130,963 families (including 23% of rural households) fished, although 60% just for home consumption. It is thought that at least a quarter of subsistence fishing is carried out by women, and women are often involved in the sale of locally caught fish. As of 2012, the tuna industry was thought to employ 6,700 people, of which 98% were from Papua New Guinea.

Of the tuna populations in the western and central Pacific, only bigeye tuna are considered overfished. Coastal fishing is generally sustainable, although urban areas such as Port Moresby have created localised overfishing.

== Management ==
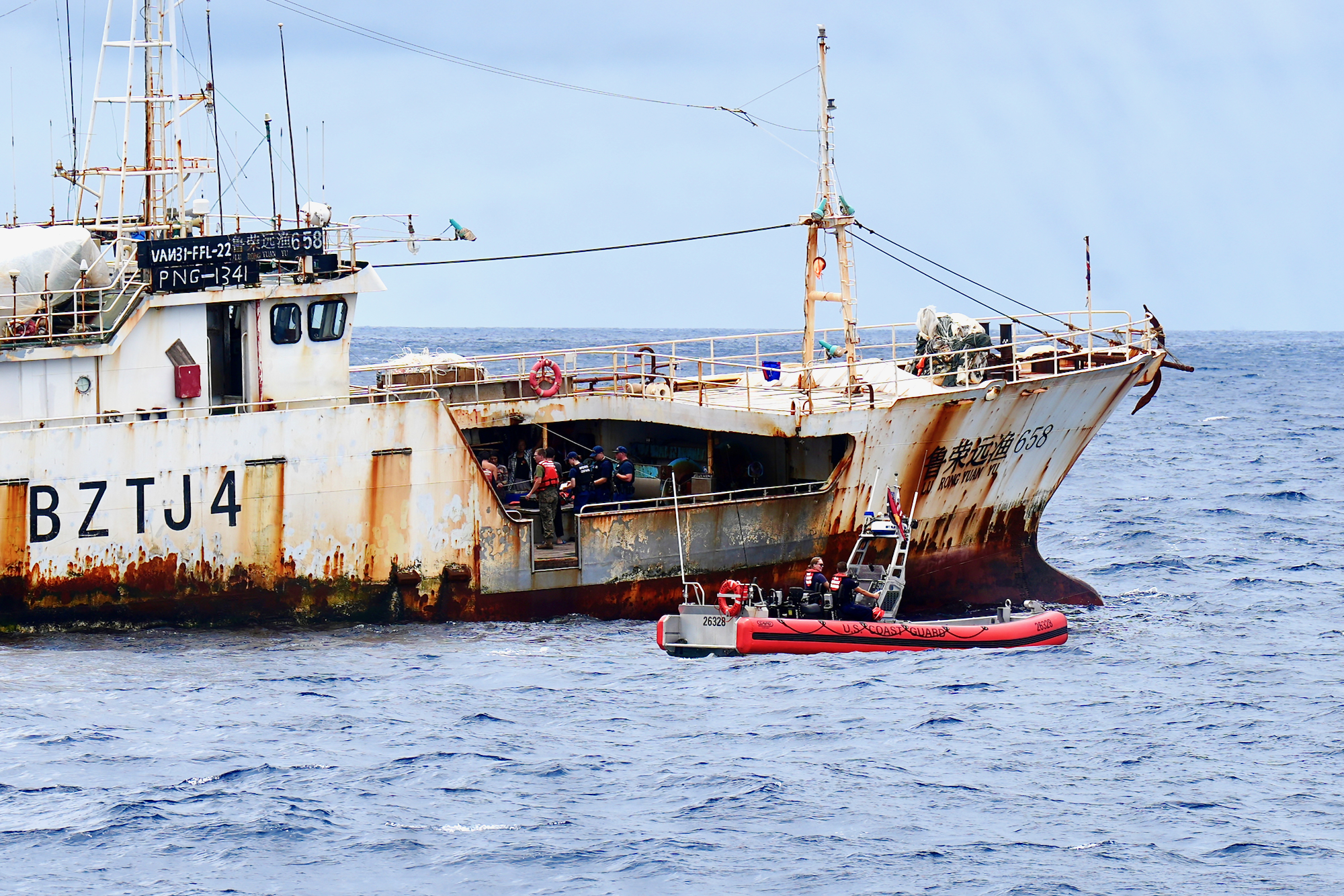
Boarding of a ship suspected of involvement in illegal, unreported and unregulated fishing by members of the Papua New Guinea and United States militaries

The constitution calls for fisheries to be managed sustainably. Responsibility for fisheries is assumed by the National Fisheries Authority (NFA). The NFA was created in 1995 by the Fisheries Act, replacing the former Department of Fisheries and Marine Resources. A Fisheries Management Act passed in 1998 gave the NFA powers to manage all inland, coastal, and offshore fisheries. This act was amended in 2012, and a Fisheries Management (Amendment) Act was passed in 2015. The 2015 act ensured the nine-person board met every three months, and included representatives from government, industry, resource owners, and non-governmental organisations. Its chair is appointed by the National Executive Council. Under the Fisheries Management Act, national management plans are created. The Fisheries Management Act is complemented by other laws, such as the 1995 Organic Law on Provincial and Local Level Governments, laws relating to shipping, and laws relating to companies.

A National Tuna Fishery Management and Development Plan guides tuna licensing and lays out gear regulations and catch controls. It has a number of objectives including sustainability, expanding the domestic sector, and increasing government revenue. Other plans include the National Live Reef Food Fish Fishery Management Plan, National Beche-de-mer Fisheries Management Plan, Barramundi Fishery Management Plan, Torres Strait and Western Province Tropical Rock Lobster Management Plan, the Gulf of Papua Prawn Fishery Management Plan, the National Shark Longline Management Plan, and plans relating to aquaculture and fish aggregating devices. Under the Organic Law on Provincial Governments and Local-level Governments, management powers can be devolved from the NFA to provincial and local governments at the discretion of the Minister for Fisheries. Management plans often involve the NFA, provincial governments, and local governments. Provincial governments can impose more restrictive controls than national requirements, but not lesser controls. Coastal provinces usually have their own fisheries office. The NFA operates the Nago Island Mariculture and Research Station in New Ireland Province, and the National Fisheries College in Kavieng. The private Fishing Industry Association of PNG was formed in January 1991, with members representing different fishing industries. A representative of this association sits on the NFA board, and another on the Governing Council of the National Fisheries College. The association has been influential in shaping fishing policy.

All longline fishing of tuna, as well as the smaller longline shark industry, is carried out by domestic companies. The shark fishery is limited to 9 ships that can lay 1,200 hooks a day, with a total annual allowance from both these ships and tuna ship bycatch of 2,000 tonnes. The tuna management plan restricts the longline sector to 100 ships, which can lay 1,200 hooks a day and catch an annual total of 10,000 bigeye and yellowfin tuna combined. However, the actual number of domestic longline ships is usually much lower than 100, with 27 in 2006 and 22 in 2007. Trawling ships are limited to 550 horsepower, 30 metres (98 ft), and a maximum of four nets. Sea cucumber harvesting has sometimes been prohibited for stretches of up to three years to preserve the populations. Instances of shark finning have been recorded during these periods. The lobster management plan bans the collection of egg-bearing females.

National regulations cover the commercial fisheries industry, but do not regulate subsistence fishing. Local communities retain traditional ownership over reefs and seabed under Section 5 of the Customs Recognition Act. This means fisheries management varies significantly depending on local practices, and fishing in these areas is often restricted to locals. The Torres Strait Protected Zone is considered within the Tropical Rock Lobster Fishery Management Plan, and catch quotas are negotiated with Australia. On a national level, some areas, particularly coastal, are closed to commercial tuna fishers. Communities often assert the right to freely fish in their waters, without paying for management. The NFA monitors fishing in the country's waters. Boats fishing without licences are taken to court by the NFA, and around 80% of such cases result in a guilty verdict.

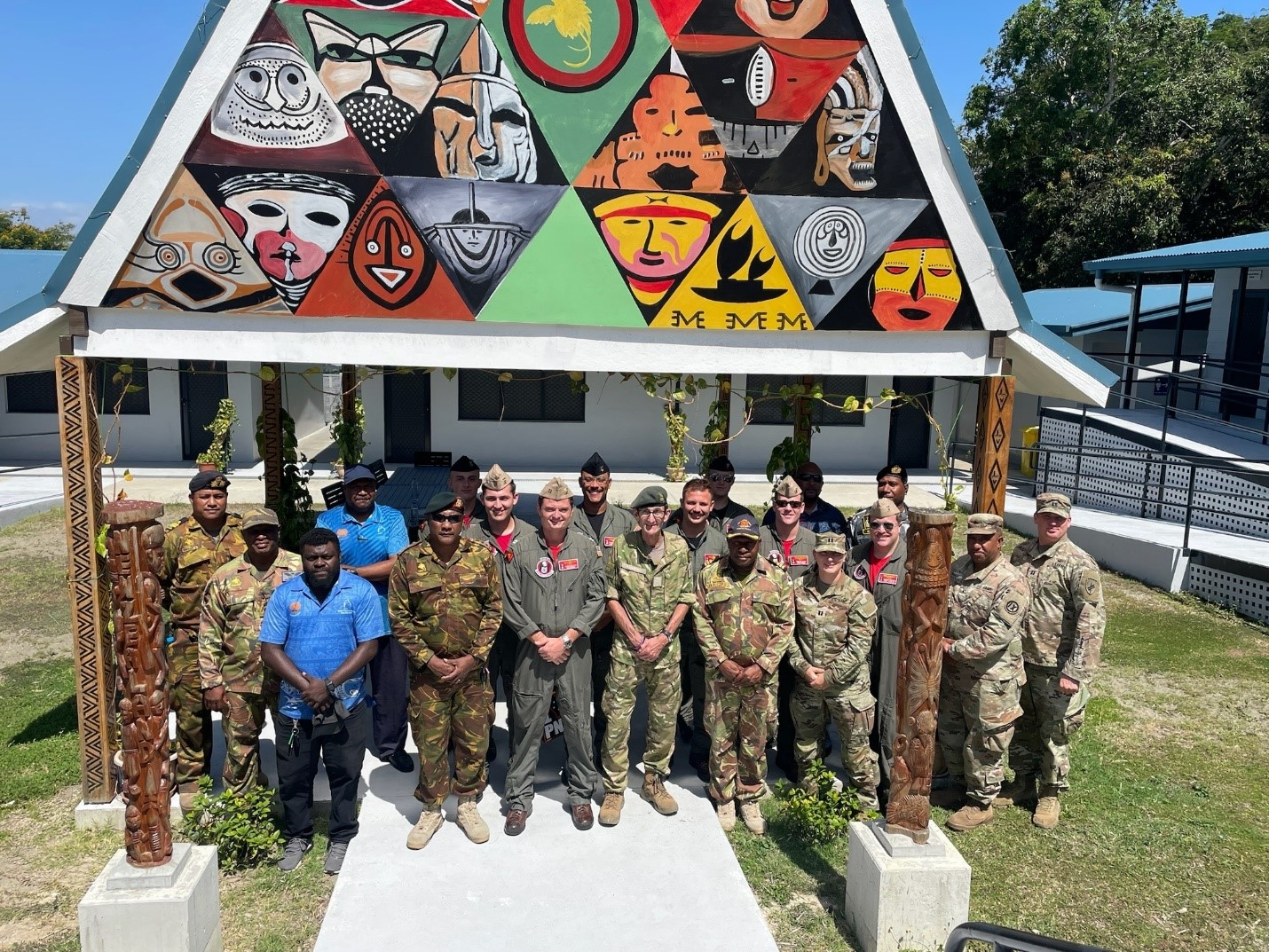
Members of the National Fisheries Authority posing alongside members of the Papua New Guinea and United States militaries following cooperation on fisheries patrolling

Papua New Guinea is party to the Western and Central Pacific Fisheries Commission and the Nauru Agreement, as well as CITES. Under the Nauru Agreement, tuna fishing is regulated on a total allowable effort basis (the number of days in which fishing is allowed). Papua New Guinea established a joint roadmap for inshore fisheries with other members of the Melanesian Spearhead Group in June 2015. Educational cooperation occurs with the Pacific Community and the Pacific Islands Forum Fisheries Agency. Other regional institutions include the Pacific Regional Environment Programme and the University of the South Pacific. Substantial foreign support has been given to the fisheries sector, especially from the European Union and the Asian Development Bank.

There are agreements for foreign fishing fleets from some countries within East Asia and the Pacific to access Papua New Guinea's waters for tuna fishing, including countries in the Nauru Agreement. The NFA is funded through access fees. The Torres Strait Treaty of 1985 governs fishing relations with Australia in the Torres Strait, implemented in Papua New Guinea through the Fisheries (Torres Strait Protected Zone) Act of 1986. Some Philippine-flagged ships operate exclusively within Papua New Guinean waters, and deposit their catch at local canneries. Many Vanuatu ships also fish within these waters.

Climate change threatens the viability of the country's coral reefs. The degradation of these reefs is expected to deplete coastal fisheries. Under a high-emissions scenario, it is thought skipjack tuna catch would decrease by one-third. A study in Kimbe Bay found that 65% of fish were dependent on reefs at one stage in their life, and overall abundance decreased as reefs degraded. Fisheries are affected by the El Niño–Southern Oscillation, as in El Niño years purse seine fishing becomes less common as fishing fleets move further east.

=== History ===
Fisheries products were traditionally part of the trade system of the region, with different products fished from inland, coastline, and reef areas. Deep-water and pelagic areas also became widely fishable as technology developed. Commercial fishing began in the 1940s, with fisheries surveys including a prawn survey of the Gulf of Papua in 1965, and tuna surveys from 1970 to 1972. Tuna fisheries developed from the 1960s. These were mostly fished by foreign ships, predominantly from Japan. Tuna fishing developed, especially in the Bismarck Sea, until low prices in 1982 reduced its economic viability. Fishing agreements with Japan were cancelled in 1987. Growth restarted in the 1990s, including the creation of domestic fishing and canning operations in Madang. Domestic consumption increased during this time, with canned tuna becoming more eaten than canned mackerel.

Prawn fishing in the Gulf of Papua began in the 1960s. Japanese interest also saw the development of this fishery in the 1970s, although this employed a large number of locals. In 1976 there were three licensed companies, operating three ships each. In 1978 there were 10 ships, and in 1981 there were 19. In 1986 some ships were chartered from Australia, meaning there were 21 operators. This prawn fishery was nationalised in the mid-1980s.

The 1970s saw the implementation of the Coastal Fisheries Development Programme, which sought to create or enhance 22 coastal fisheries stations (up from a planned 20) each at least 200 kilometres (120 mi) from its neighbours. These stations would have facilities to freeze and store fish, and deliver catch to larger towns. However, they proved economically unviable. Many fishermen fished only until immediate needs were met, rather than develop fishing into a business. These stations closed in the 1990s. Government attempts to introduce the Samoan hand-reel to rural communities also saw little success. In 1981, Orangerie Bay began to be seasonally fished by small (9–16 metres (30–52 ft)) vessels. In 1987, Papua New Guinean companies began to fish in the Torres Strait, although this was already fished by Australian companies. Small-scale trawl fishing in Western Province began after a survey in 1982 confirmed its viability up to 10 nautical miles (19 km; 12 mi) from shore.

Freshwater aquaculture began to be encouraged in 1954. The first freshwater aquaculture facility was established by the NFA in Aiyura, Eastern Highlands Province, in the 1960s, and saw the growth of carp aquaculture in the highlands. This facility was further developed with foreign assistance over the succeeding decades. In 2002 the facility began to distribute genetically improved farmed tilapia, and tilapia farming began to grow after 2005. The national government programme to encourage common carp and rainbow trout aquaculture was transferred to provincial governments in 1996. Assistance from the Japan International Cooperation Agency helped create viable rainbow trout aquaculture near Mount Wilhelm in Chimbu Province. In 1997, Pinctada maxima oyster farming began in Milne Bay Province. There is some barramundi aquaculture in Madang Province. An Australian survey in 2006 found that there were 8,000 small-scale fish farmers, and perhaps 2,000 who had facilities but no fish stocks. However, total aquaculture production is difficult to measure and monitor.

In the 1980s trawling vessels were prohibited from fishing within 3 miles (4.8 km) of the coast. The first national fisheries legislation was the 1984 Fisheries Act which created the Department of Fisheries and Marine Resources. This was initiated to ensure fisheries had specific focus, as its prior management under the Department of Agriculture and Livestock left it under-developed. The act was reviewed in 1990, producing the revised Fisheries Act of 1994 which established the NFA. This revised act shifted the power to issue fishing licences from the Minister of Fisheries to a larger National Fisheries Board, with the goal of making licensing more impartial. This ten-person board was put in charge of the NFA. The 1994 act also increased the powers of the government to regulate fisheries for the purpose of sustainability. However, it focused only on commercial fishing, and did not regulate subsistence fishing, although the law called for the NFA to develop the subsistence sector. At the time this law was produced, it was expected that the upcoming Organic Law on Provincial Governments and Local-level Governments would include management of subsistence fisheries, but this did not occur. Further revisions were made in the 1998 Fisheries Management Act, which altered licensing and management practices. The relationship between the NFA and the powers of the provinces and districts was left undefined.

After being relatively stable following an increase in the late 1990s and early 2000s, recorded exports were 57,881 metric tonnes in 2014, before increasing to 145,624 tonnes in 2015 and 260,009 in 2016. It has fluctuated since then, and was at 168,874 tonnes in 2022. Some of this variability is caused by climatic changes, with purse seine fishing being less common in El Niño–Southern Oscillation years as fishing fleets move further east. In 2023, a cannery in Lae closed due to being unable to afford tuna. An industry chairman attributed this to a rule change in 2018 that required fishing vessels to pay the government US$10,500 per day. (Although this had been reduced to US$6,500 for Papua New Guinean vessels and US$7,500 for international vessels.)

In 2024, the Ministry of International Trade and Investment began a project with the government of Madang Province and the Philippine-based tuna company RD Corporation to create the Madang Integrated Special Economic Zone. It is envisioned that this zone will contain a dedicated wharf, fish storage facilities, tin can manufacturers, canneries, and other facilities to support the tuna industry. This would build upon an existing RD Corporation facility in Madang that is not profitable in its current state, with the aim of increasing the amount of catch that is processed domestically. The ability to obtain US dollars impedes the operations of RD Corporation, as they are unable to buy catch from some companies with kina. The zone was later referred to as the Pacific Marine Industrial Zone. The new cannery would be 50% owned by RD Corporation, with the other 50% split between the national government, the provincial government, and the Sumkar District government. The national government claims the cannery would support 10,000 jobs and process 330 metric tonnes of fish. It also envisions further canneries being built, with a target of 10 in Madang. The government has attributed the idea for the zone to former prime minister Michael Somare some time around 2010.

Prime Minister James Marape stated at the 51st Pacific Islands Forum that fisheries operators would be able to convert licences to harvest and export raw product into licences to export processed product. In 2022 the NFA began sharing data of the 50 licensed purse seine vessels in the country's waters with Global Fishing Watch, allowing public monitoring. In 2025, the government stated that all fishing companies would be required to land 25–40% of their catch in Papua New Guinea. At that time, 20% of catch was landed domestically.
