= EcoPeace Middle East =

Organization

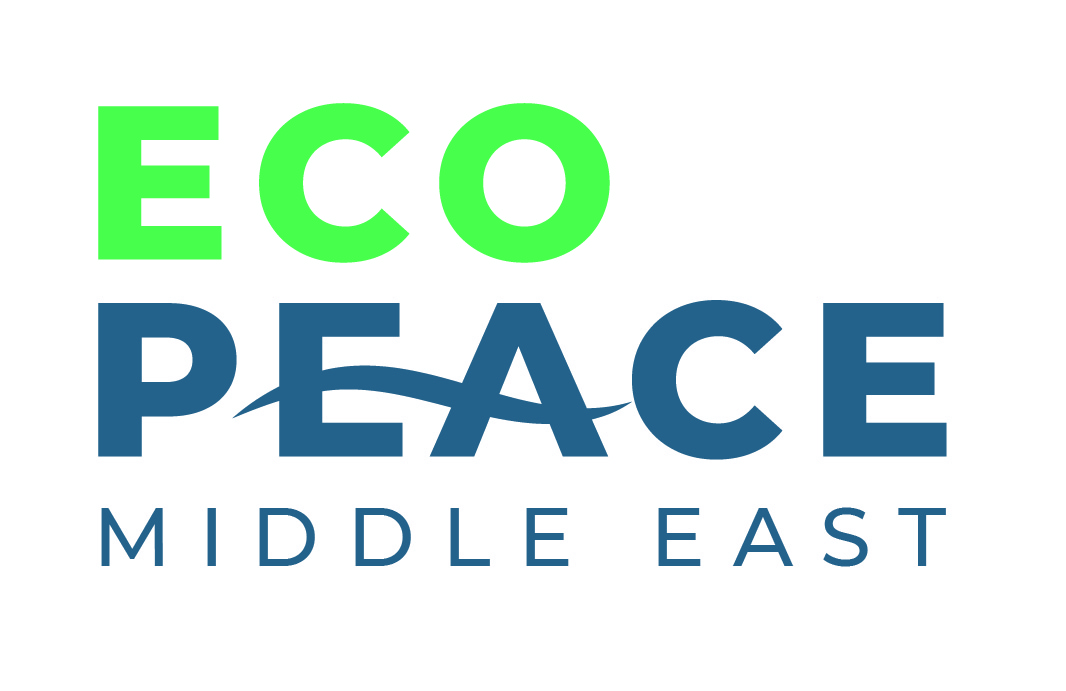
- Founded: 1994
- Key people: Gidon Bromberg (Israeli Director), Nada Majdalani (Palestinian Director), Yana Abu Taleb (Jordanian Director)
- Website: www.ecopeaceme.org

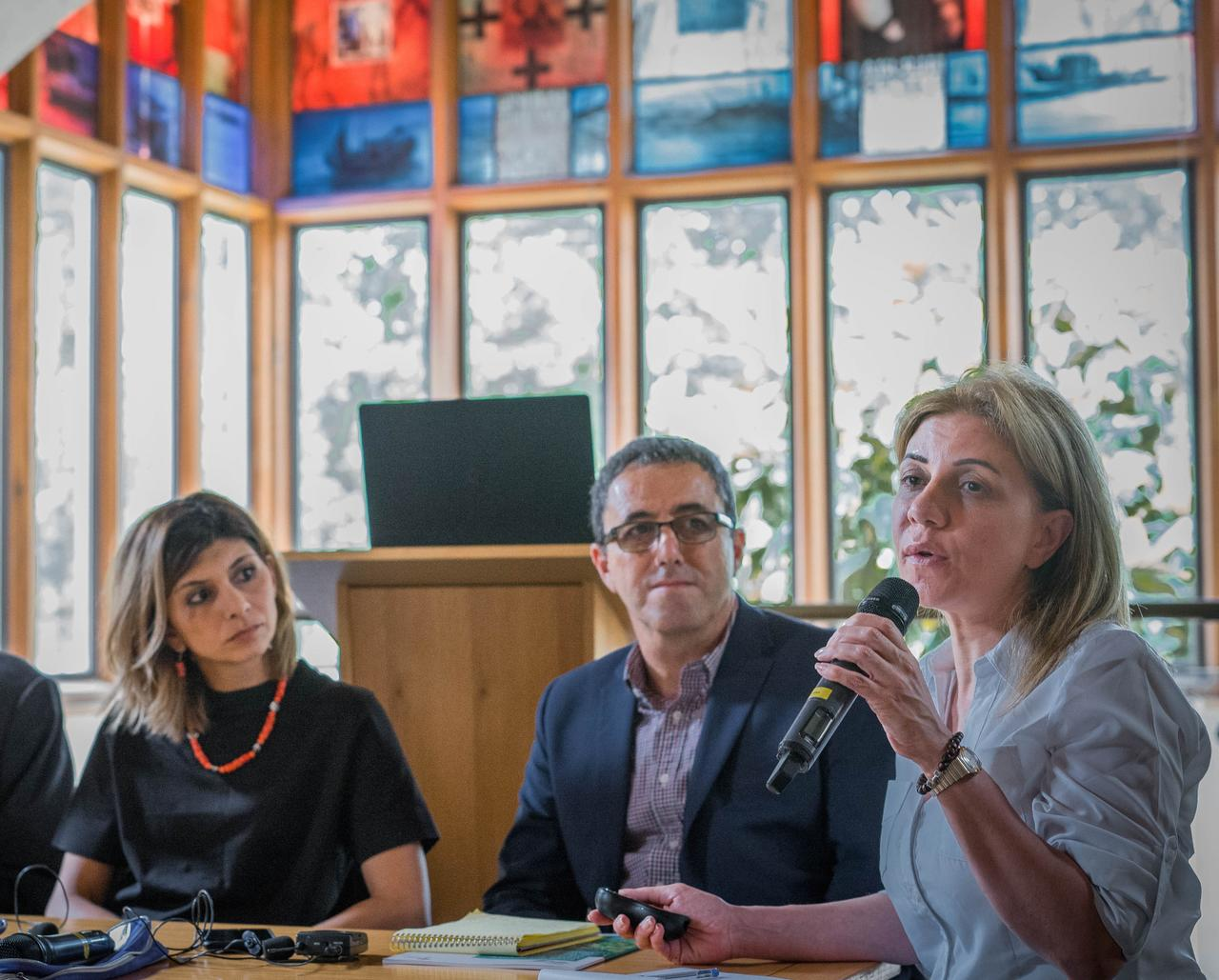
From left to right: Nada Majdalani (Director - Palestine), Gidon Bromberg (Director - Israel), Yana Abu Taleb (Director - Jordan)

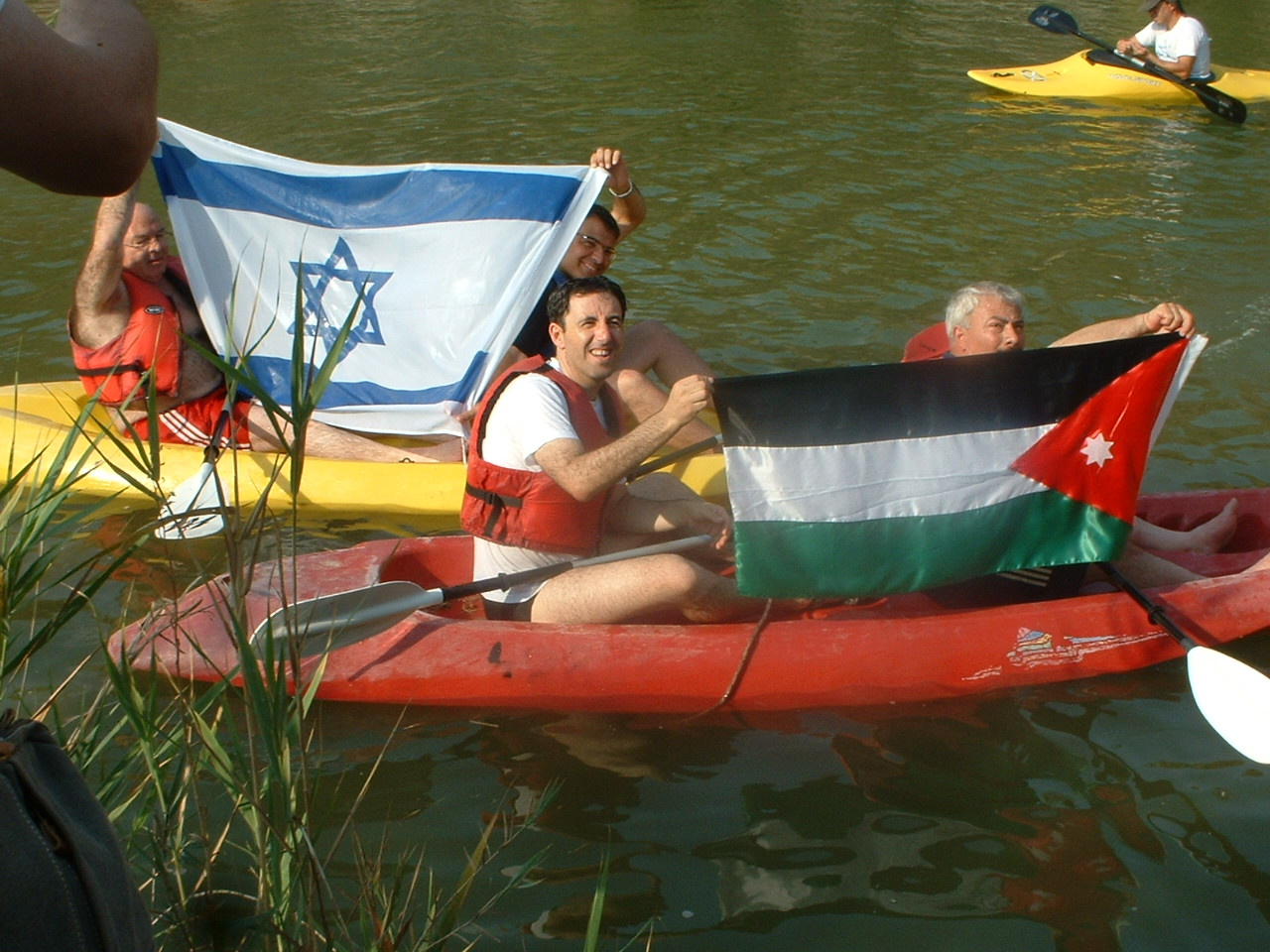
Environmental peacemakers on the Jordan River. Center: Gidon Bromberg

EcoPeace Middle East, formerly Friends of the Earth Middle East (1994–2014), is a regional environmental peacebuilding organization in the Middle East, with a board equally involving Jordanians, Palestinians, and Israelis.

== Name ==
EcoPeace was co-founded in 1994 by Israeli environmentalist Gidon Bromberg, bringing together Israelis, Palestinians, Egyptians, and Jordanians in the wake of the Arab-Israeli peace processes of the 1990s. After joining the international Friends of the Earth network, EcoPeace became Friends of the Earth Middle East, but in 2014 it left the network, reverting to the initial name as EcoPeace Middle East.

== Description ==
EcoPeace Middle East works to advance environmental tri-lateral cooperation on desalination and renewable energy, with the declared aim of turning regional integration into a concrete driver of stability and innovation. Its proposed “IMEC Peace Triangle” framework seeks to link infrastructure and economic connectivity with climate resilience and regional security objectives.

== Actions ==
EcoPeace has taken a leading role in calling for action to save the Dead Sea, which may be in danger of drying up due to some environmental factors. Various groups and government officials from several countries say that a pipeline from the Red Sea is needed to save the Dead Sea. In June 2009, after a meeting with World Bank President Robert Zoellick, the Israeli Regional Cooperation Minister, Silvan Shalom, announced a pilot project to build a "pilot" pipe 180 km (110 mi) long from the Red Sea to the Dead Sea. The pipe would pump 200 million cubic meters per year. Half of this would be desalinated for Jordanian consumption and half put into the Dead Sea. Some experts questioned this project. Hebrew University of Jerusalem Prof. Avner Adin said more studies were needed on the potential environmental impact.

Among the key initiatives is the 2022 Water for Energy agreement between Israel and Jordan. As global leader in desalination, Israel supplies drinking water produced from seawater. In return, Jordan which has vast desert areas suited to renewable energy, develops solar and wind installations designed to supply Israel with green electricity.

In the same year, the organization's efforts led to Israel approving sewage treatment in Gaza, enabling the restoration of Strip's biggest wetland, the Wadi Gaza, whose naturally rich biodiversity had been severed with sewage for three decades.

=== Green Blue Deal ===
EcoPeace Middle East has presented the Green Blue Deal as a proposed framework for regional cooperation on water, energy and climate issues. The proposal includes four main areas: cross-border cooperation between Jordan, Palestine, and Israel to provide mutual resilience in water and energy systems; measures concerning Israeli-Palestinian water allocation and infrastructure; restoration of the ecological integrity of the Jordan River through "green-smart” investments into the Jordan valley; and public engagement around “climate diplomacy”.

The Middle East and North Africa is among the most water-stressed regions globally. The Levant, comprising Israel, Lebanon, Jordan, Syria, and Palestine, historically formed part of the Fertile Crescent, often described as a cradle of early civilization. In recent decades, increasing water scarcity, compounded by climate change, has placed pressure on natural resources and infrastructure. Competition over shared water systems has contributed to regional tensions, while also prompting calls for greater cross-border cooperation. To illustrate how a “Green Blue Deal” could operate in the region, analyses highlight the distinct challenges and capacities of each party. To illustrate how a “Green Blue Deal” could operate in the region, analyses highlight the distinct challenges and capacities of each party.

Palestinian territories face severe water insecurity, particularly in the Gaza Strip. The Israeli government deliberately and systematically denies Palestinians access to clean water as a form of collective punishment, particularly during the war in Gaza. Additionally, water infrastructure in the West Bank is often targeted by illegal Israeli settlers.

Jordan faces water-security pressures from population growth, refugee inflows, and rising urban demand, which have contributed to intermittent municipal water supply and reduced freshwater availability for agriculture in the Jordan Valley. The country's energy sector has also been identified as a potential area for climate action, particularly through solar-power development. In 2017, the Jordanian Ministry of Environment released the “Jordan 2025” green growth plan, prioritizing water, energy, and food security, although the plan has been described as lacking clear targets, financing mechanisms, and full government adoption.

Israel has promoted clean technology, renewable energy, ecosystem restoration, and improved environmental performance as part of its climate and development policies. The country's desalination, wastewater-treatment, and alternative-energy capacities have been listed as factors in its climate-adaptation capacity. At the same time, regional water insecurity, including in Palestine and Jordan, and wastewater-management problems in Gaza have been described as transboundary environmental challenges requiring regional cooperation.

Structural constraints, demographic pressures, and existing water-sharing arrangements such as those established under the Oslo Accords, also limit access and management capacity. Environmental policy frameworks exist, but implementation depends on external investment and regional cooperation.

==== Existing political frameworks ====
Water issues were addressed in the Oslo Accords, notably under Article 40 of Annex III of the 1995 Interim Agreement (Oslo II), which set out provisions for the management of water and sewage in the West Bank. The agreement recognized Palestinian water rights in principle, while deferring their full definition to final status negotiations. It provided for the transfer of certain water and sanitation responsibilities to Palestinian authorities, limited to areas serving Palestinian populations, and left questions of infrastructure ownership to future negotiations. The agreement also estimated Palestinian water needs in the West Bank at 70–80 million cubic meters per year. A Joint Water Committee was established to oversee cooperation and approve related projects. These arrangements were conceived as interim measures but have remained in place beyond their intended timeframe. Although Israel has made available approximately 70 MCM/year of water to the Palestinians in the West Bank, this quantitative approach to the water issue did not sufficiently take into account the natural, political and socio-economic developments that have affected water supply and demand in the region since.

In 2021, an agreement named water-for-energy deal (also known as Project Prosperity), brokered with U.S. involvement, called for a UAE-funded solar farm in Jordan to supply (green) renewable energy to Israel and for an Israeli desalination plant to provide (blue) water to Jordan. EuroMeSCo, a Euro-Mediterranean network of policy research institutes and think tanks, described the Israel–Jordan–UAE water-for-energy agreement as a possible but partial realization of EcoPeace Middle East's Green Blue Deal. The analysis connected the initiative to regional climate and water diplomacy and to possible European Union involvement in Middle East climate policy.

== Awards ==
- Heroes of the Environment 2008 by Time magazine to EcoPeace's three co-directors: Gidon Bromberg (Israel), Munqeth Mehyar (Jordan) and Nader Al-Khateeb (Palestine)
- Skoll Award in 2009.
- Onassis Prize for the Protection of the Environment.
- 9th World Forum for Democracy 2021 Democracy Innovation Award, granted by the Council of Europe for Green Blue Deal for the Middle East, an initiative by EcoPeace Middle East which brings together Israeli, Palestinian and Jordanian environmentalists.
- In 2024, the environmental peacebuilding organization EcoPeace has been nominated for a Nobel Peace Prize by the Vrije Universiteit Amsterdam.
- Al-Moumin Award and Distinguished Lecture on Environmental Peacebuilding 2025, granted by The Environmental Peacebuilding Association to EcoPeace leaders Nada Majdalani, Yana Abu Taleb, Gidon Bromberg, and Tareq Abu Hamed.
