= Nader Al-Khateeb =

General director of WEDO (born 1960)

- نادر الخطيب
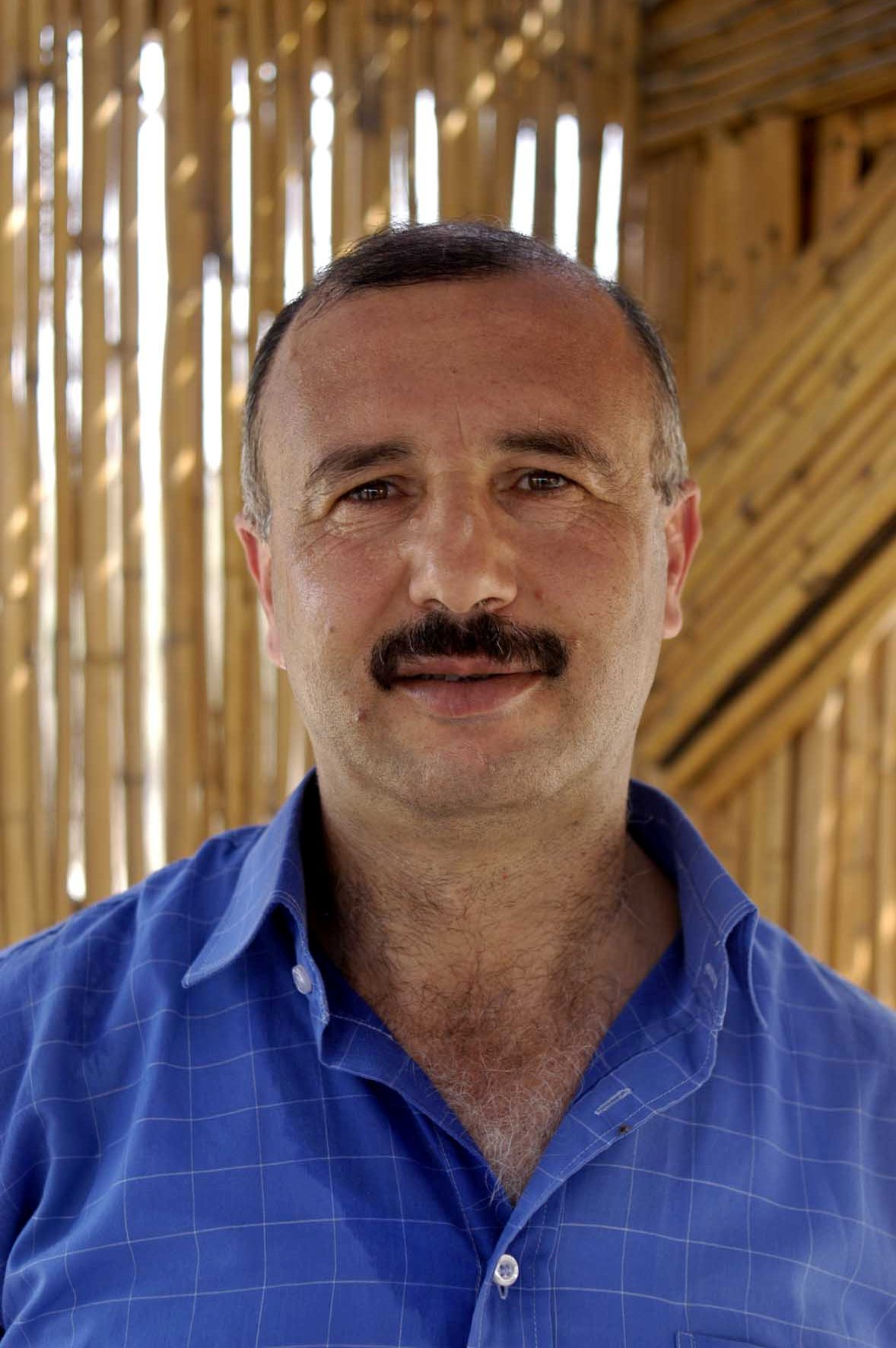
- Born: July 30, 1960 (age 66)

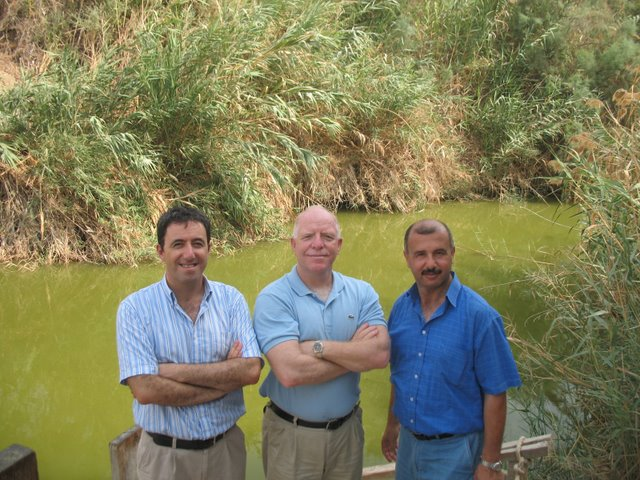
The three co-directors of EcoPeace Middle East at the Jordan River. From left to right: Gidon Bromberg (Israel), Munqeth Mehyar (Jordan), Nader Al-Khateeb (Palestine)

Nader Al-Khateeb (Arabic: نادر الخطيب) (born July 30, 1960) is the General Director of the Water and Environmental Development Organization (WEDO), a non-profit Palestinian organization that promotes a number of environmental programs and projects centered on water quality control, water conservation, wastewater treatment and reuse, as well as solid waste management and recycling. He was also the Palestinian Director of EcoPeace Middle East (formerly Friends of the Earth Middle East (FoEME)) from its establishment until 2017. EcoPeace Middle East is a unique regional organization that brings together Jordanian, Palestinian and Israeli environmentalists to promote sustainable development and advance peace efforts in the Middle East. It has offices in Amman, Bethlehem and Tel Aviv, employs 40 paid staff and actively involves hundreds of volunteers.

In 1983, Nader Al-Khateeb graduated from the Middle East Technical University in Turkey with a B.Sc. in Geological Engineering. He went on to acquire an M.Sc. degree in Environmental Management from the Loughborough University of Technology in the U.K. in 1989. He has since had over 20 years of experience in water management and sanitation.

Mr. Al-Khateeb served as Chief Engineer for the Bethlehem, Beit Jala and Beit Sahour Water Authority from 1984 to 1993, where he was responsible for planning and fundraising, as well as operations and maintenance of the distribution network. After returning from leave to acquire his M.Sc. degree, he also became the Project Manager for their drainage and sewerage project.

From 1994 to 1997, Mr. Al-Khateeb was a senior water resource engineer with the UNDP's Water Resources Action Program, working as a consultant in the effort to formulate and establish the Palestinian Water Authority (PWA). He then became associated with the PWA itself, coordinating a host of water and wastewater projects.

In 1998, he resigned from this role to work with the newly established Water and Environmental Development Organization (WEDO). During this time he also served as a consultant to various international development organizations working in the water sector. He carried out feasibility studies for the industrial waste management sector in Hebron under USAID, worked with UNESCO to prepare a conceptual Emergency Master Plan for the Bethlehem Region and trained municipal engineers in the Gaza Strip on wastewater collection and treatment systems along with the German group Carl Duisberg Gesellschaft (CDG). In 2001, WEDO became the base for the Palestinian branch of Friends of the Earth Middle East (FoEME) and Mr. Al-Khateeb has served as its director until he stepped down in 2017.

He holds a host of professional memberships with such organizations as the Jordan Engineers Association, Israel/Palestine Center for Research and Information, Palestinian Technical and Advisory Committees on Water for the multilateral negotiations, and the Consultative Training Board established by the German group Carl Duisberg Gesellschaft (CDG) for training Palestinian professionals in the water sector.

Mr. Al-Khateeb is a registered Professional Engineer in the West Bank and a registered Professional Engineer in Amman, Jordan, in the Division of Mining Engineering, Section of Geological Engineering.

== Awards ==
EcoPeace Middle East's three co-directors—Nader Al-Khateeb (Palestine), Gidon Bromberg (Israel) and Munqeth Mehyar (Jordan) -- were honored by TIME Magazine as Heroes of the Environment (2008) and the organization was granted the prestigious Skoll Award in 2009. EcoPeace Middle East also received a 2008 SEED Finalist Award.

== Published works ==
EcoPeace Middle East Reports: co-author

- Environmental Peacebuilding Theory and Practice
- Identifying Common Environmental Problems and Shared Solutions
- Good Water Neighbors
- Municipal Cooperation across Conflict Divides - A Preliminary Study
- Nature, Agriculture and the Price of Water in Israel
- Economic Valuation of Resuscitating the Dead Sea
- Advancing Conservation and Sustainable Development of the Dead Sea Basin - Broadening the Debate on Economic and Management Issues
- Let the Dead Sea Live
- Dead Sea Challenges
- One Basin - One Strategy
- Jordan River Peace Park Pre Feasibility Study
- How Past Trans-boundary Security Arrangements Can Change the Future of Peace Parks in the Tri-partite Region
- FoEME Report on the Proposed Red Dead Conduit
- Red Sea-Dead Sea Conduit - Geo-Environmental Study Along the Arava Valley
- A Seeping Time Bomb: Pollution of the Mountain Aquifer by Solid Waste

For more, see Publications tab on FoEME website
