= Aquaculture in Papua New Guinea =

Aquaculture

Aquaculture in Papua New Guinea is a developing industry, despite having been first introduced to the country in the 1960s. The only forms of traditional aquaculture in Manus Island and fish culture on Bougainville Island. Numerous attempts to introduce both marine and freshwater aquaculture in Papua New Guinea have been unsuccessful. Currently, the main freshwater facility for aquaculture is the Highlands Aquaculture Development Center in Aiyura.

== See also ==
- Agriculture in Papua New Guinea
