= Forests Now Declaration =

The Forests Now Declaration was a 2007 declaration that advocates using carbon credits to protect tropical forests. The Declaration was created by the Global Canopy Programme, and has been signed by over 200 NGOs, business leaders, scientists and conservationists. The Declaration was created as carbon credits from land use, land-use change and forestry were omitted from the Clean Development Mechanism for the First Commitment Period of the Kyoto Protocol despite contributing 18–25% of all emissions.

== Rationale ==
Deforestation in the next five years will release more carbon dioxide than all aircraft since the Wright Brothers until at least 2025; however, credits from reduced deforestation were omitted from the Clean Development Mechanism for the first commitment period of the Kyoto Protocol, so there is little incentive for forested countries to reduce their deforestation rates. The Forests NOW declaration seeks to establish new market based mechanisms to protect the ecosystem services that forests provide in biodiversity conservation, carbon sequestration and global and local hydrological and mineral cycles.

== Prescriptions ==
The Declaration prescribes six changes to the existing carbon market frameworks:

- Ensure that carbon credits for reduced emissions from deforestation and degradation (REDD) and the protection of standing forests are included in all national and international carbon markets, especially those created by the UN Framework Convention on Climate Change.
- Simplify and expand carbon market rules, including the Clean Development Mechanism, to encourage reforestation, afforestation and sustainable forest management.
- Include tropical forest and land use carbon credits in the European Union Emissions Trading Scheme, while maintaining strong incentives to reduce industrial emissions.
- Encourage mechanisms that recognise the value of carbon stocks and forest ecosystem services, and support appropriate voluntary carbon market standards.
- Provide assistance for developing nations to build capacity to fully participate in the carbon markets, and to evaluate the ecosystem services their forests provide.
- Incentivize the sustainable use of degraded land and ecosystems, and remove incentives that encourage forest destruction.

== Signatories ==
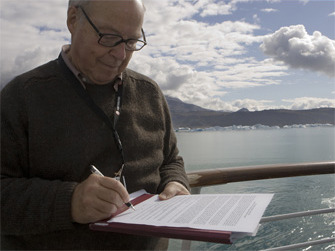
Hans Blix signs the Forests NOW declaration in the Arctic, 12 September 2007.

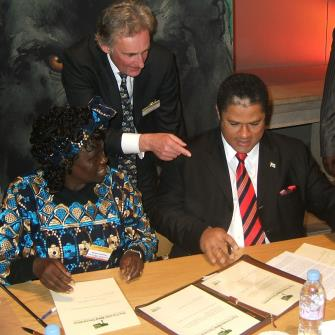
Wangari Maathai and H. E. Pembe Didace Bokiaga, Environment Minister of the Democratic Republic of Congo, sign the declaration.

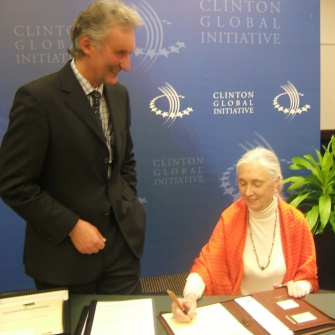
Jane Goodall signs the declaration in New York, 26 September 2007.

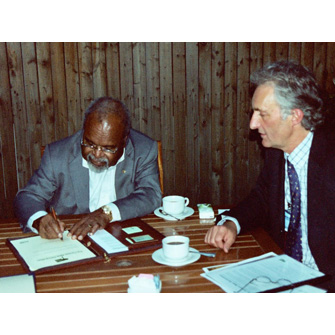
Sir Michael Somare, Prime Minister of Papua New Guinea, signs the declaration.

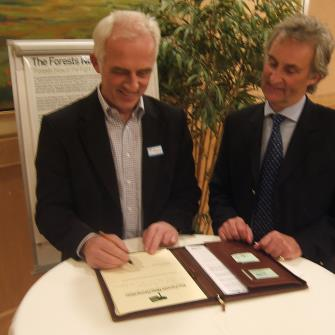
Senior Adviser on EU and Global Ecosystems for the World Conservation Union (IUCN) signs the Declaration.

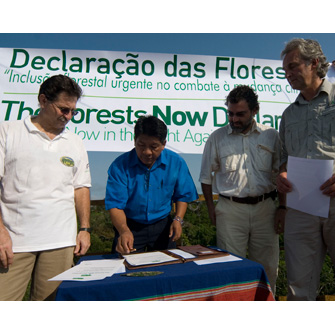
Pedro Garcia signs the Forests Now Declaration on behalf of the Confederation of Indigenous Organisations of the Brazilian Amazon (COIAB), which represents some 180 tribes in the region.

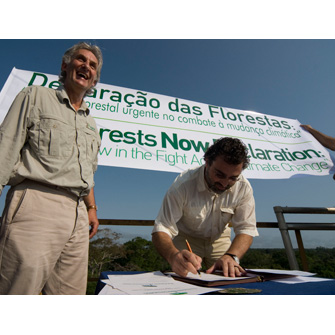
Amazonas Secretary of State for Environment and Sustainable Development Virgilio Viana signs the Forests Now Declaration.

Over 200 individuals and organisations have signed the declaration including:

=== Organisations ===
- Coalition for Rainforest Nations
- Conservation International
- Flora and Fauna International
- The Forest Trust
- Wildlife Conservation Society
- Union of Concerned Scientists

=== Individuals ===
- Hans Blix
- Jane Goodall
- Wangari Maathai
