= Gidon Bromberg =

Israeli activist and lawyer

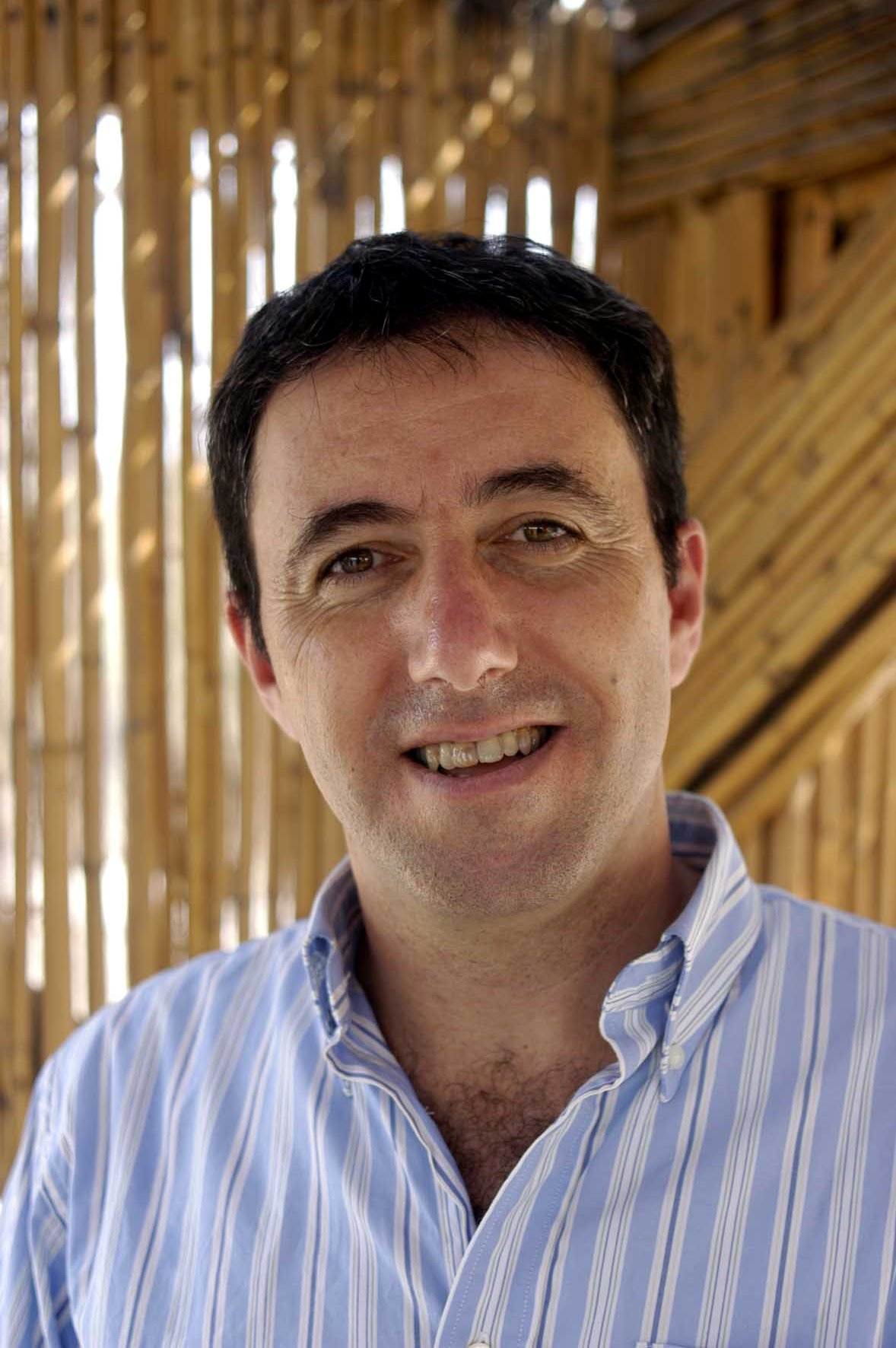
Gidon Bromberg

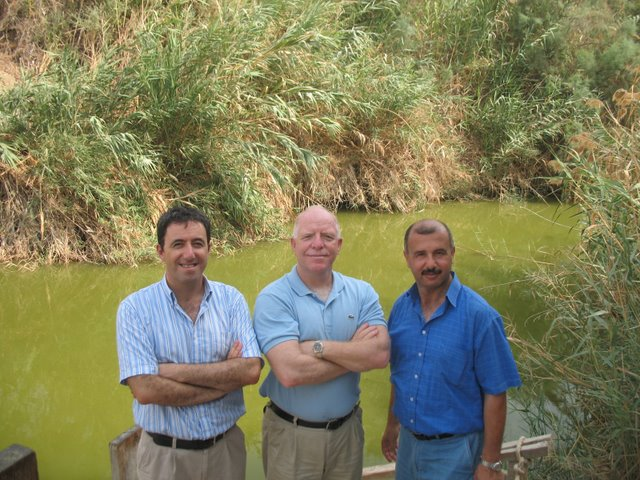
The 2008 co-directors of EcoPeace Middle East at the Jordan River. From left to right: Gidon Bromberg (Israel), Munqeth Mehyar (Jordan), Nader Al-Khateeb (Palestine)

Gidon Bromberg (Hebrew: גדעון ברומברג; born November 26, 1963) is the Israeli director of EcoPeace Middle East (formerly Friends of the Earth Middle East). EcoPeace is a regional organization that brings together Jordanian, Palestinian and Israeli environmentalists to promote sustainable development and advance peace efforts in the Middle East. It has offices in Amman, Bethlehem and Tel Aviv, employs 40 paid staff and actively involves hundreds of volunteers.

Bromberg founded the organization under the name of EcoPeace in 1994 and has been the Israeli director ever since. In 1997, he led the entry of the organization into Friends of the Earth International, the largest grassroots environmental organization in the world. He has spearheaded the organization's advocacy campaigns both in Israel and internationally. He developed its particularly notable cross-border community peace-building project "Good Water Neighbors", which is now seen as a model for other programs in conflict areas.

Bromberg speaks regularly on water, peace and security issues in various forums. He has presented before the UN Commission for Sustainable Development, the United States House Committee on Foreign Affairs, the European Parliament and the advisory meeting to the UN High Level Panel on Security. He is a member of the Israeli Inter-Ministerial Committee on the Future of the Dead Sea, of the Israel UNESCO World Heritage Committee and the Inter-Ministerial Committee for Sustainable Development in Israel. In 2007, Mr. Bromberg was invited to join the EastWest Institute's International Task Force for Preventive Diplomacy. Most recently, he was selected for the 2007 World Fellowship at Yale University on global leadership.

Bromberg is an attorney by profession and previously worked in public interest environmental law. He is a member of the Israel Bar Association. He holds a Bachelor of Economics and a law degree from Monash University in Australia. As a fellow of the New Israel Fund, he completed a master's degree in international environmental law at the American University in Washington, D.C. He has published over twenty academic and popular publications concerning Middle East environmental policy and water security issues.

== Awards ==
EcoPeace's three co-directors at the time - Gidon Bromberg (Israel), Munqeth Mehyar (Jordan) and Nader Al-Khateeb (Palestine) - were honored by Time magazine as Heroes of the Environment (2008) and the organization was granted the prestigious Skoll Award in 2009. EcoPeace also received a 2008 SEED Finalist Award. in 2021, EcoPeace Middle East was granted the Council of Europe’s Democracy Innovation Award, for their Green Blue Deal for the Middle East, aiming to bring together Israeli, Palestinian and Jordanian environmentalists in peace building efforts over the challenges associated with water scarcity.

== Published works ==
=== Op-eds: principal author ===
- "Let common sense flow". Haaretz online. October 12, 2008.
- "Will it save the Dead Sea?" bitterlemons-international.org: Middle East Roundtable. June 24, 2005.

=== EcoPeace Middle East Reports: co-author ===
- Environmental Peacebuilding Theory and Practice
- Identifying Common Environmental Problems and Shared Solutions
- Good Water Neighbors
- Municipal Cooperation across Conflict Divides - A Preliminary Study
- Nature, Agriculture and the Price of Water in Israel
- Economic Valuation of Resuscitating the Dead Sea
- Advancing Conservation and Sustainable Development of the Dead Sea Basin - Broadening the Debate on Economic and Management Issues
- Let the Dead Sea Live
- Dead Sea Challenges
- One Basin - One Strategy
- Jordan River Peace Park Pre Feasibility Study
- How Past Trans-boundary Security Arrangements Can Change the Future of Peace Parks in the Tri-partite Region
- FoEME Report on the Proposed Red Dead Conduit
- Red Sea-Dead Sea Conduit - Geo-Environmental Study Along the Arava Valley
- A Seeping Time Bomb: Pollution of the Mountain Aquifer by Solid Waste

For more, see Publications tab on EcoPeace Middle East website
