= Coalition for Rainforest Nations =

Intergovernmental organization

- Abbreviation: CfRN
- Formation: 2005; 21 years ago
- Headquarters: Columbia University; New York City, New York, US
- Members: 53 nations in the Americas, Africa, and Oceania
- Website: www.rainforestcoalition.org

The Coalition for Rainforest Nations (CfRN) is an intergovernmental organization established by forested tropical countries to collaboratively reconcile forest stewardship with economic development. The Rainforest Coalition aims to bring together both developing and industrialized nations for the purpose of creating community-driven, environmentally sustainable growth. The primary method by which the CfRN aims to promote this growth is through a method known as Reducing Emissions from Deforestation and Forest Degradation (REDD+), which was launched after the formation of the CfRN on May 10, 2005.

The primary strategy of the Coalition is to bring about the reform of international frameworks, both legal and economic, to correct market failures that result in unsustainable outcomes. This involves creating economic incentives for the preservation of areas of high biodiversity and endemism worldwide. The Coalition supports the Forests Now Declaration by calling for changes in the Kyoto Protocol and other international carbon markets to include land use and forestry. One practice promoted by REDD+ is utilizing carbon credits to protect forested tropical countries, which is a market-based method of reducing a nation's emitted greenhouse gas emissions. Carbon credits are one of many incentives that assist the CfRN in achieving its overarching objective to reduce the total amount of greenhouse gas emissions across forested tropical countries, promoting sustainability.

== History ==
At the request of then Prime Minister of Papua New Guinea Sir Michael Somare, the participating nations have agreed to base the Secretariat for the Coalition for Rainforest Nations at Columbia University in the City of New York. The CfRN was formed after a speech given on May 10, 2005, at Columbia University by Somare. After its establishment, the CfRN launched a new method of environmental sustainability known as Reducing Emissions from Deforestation and Forest Degradation (REDD+).

This specific sustainability method involves the protection of forests by incentivizing developing countries to reduce deforestation. Developed by the United Nations Framework Convention on Climate Change (UNFCCC), this method has allowed the CfRN to provide developing countries with incentives for reducing forest degradation and enhancing carbon stocks. The CfRN's initial implementation of REDD+ in 2005 has lasted many years, leading to significant advancements in environmental sustainability. REDD+ has since been implemented into Article 5 of the 2015 Paris Agreement and other worldwide climate agreements. This has allowied the CfRN to expand its status as an intergovernmental organization, as REDD+ efforts have been widely successful.

Since its formation, the Coalition has been instrumental in the establishment of the World Bank's Forest Carbon Partnership Facility and the United Nations' UN-REDD program. Further, based upon these efforts by the Coalition, various industrialized countries (including Norway, the UK, Germany, France, Japan, Australia, Finland, and others) have currently pledged around US$3.0 billion. This money is directed toward capacity building and incentives to reduce rates of deforestation in participating developing countries. By collaborating together to reduce rates of deforestation, the relationship between these countries emphasizes the importance of trust among CfRN member states. Collaboration between countries is fostered by the CfRN's promotion of conservation efforts regarding current environmental issues.

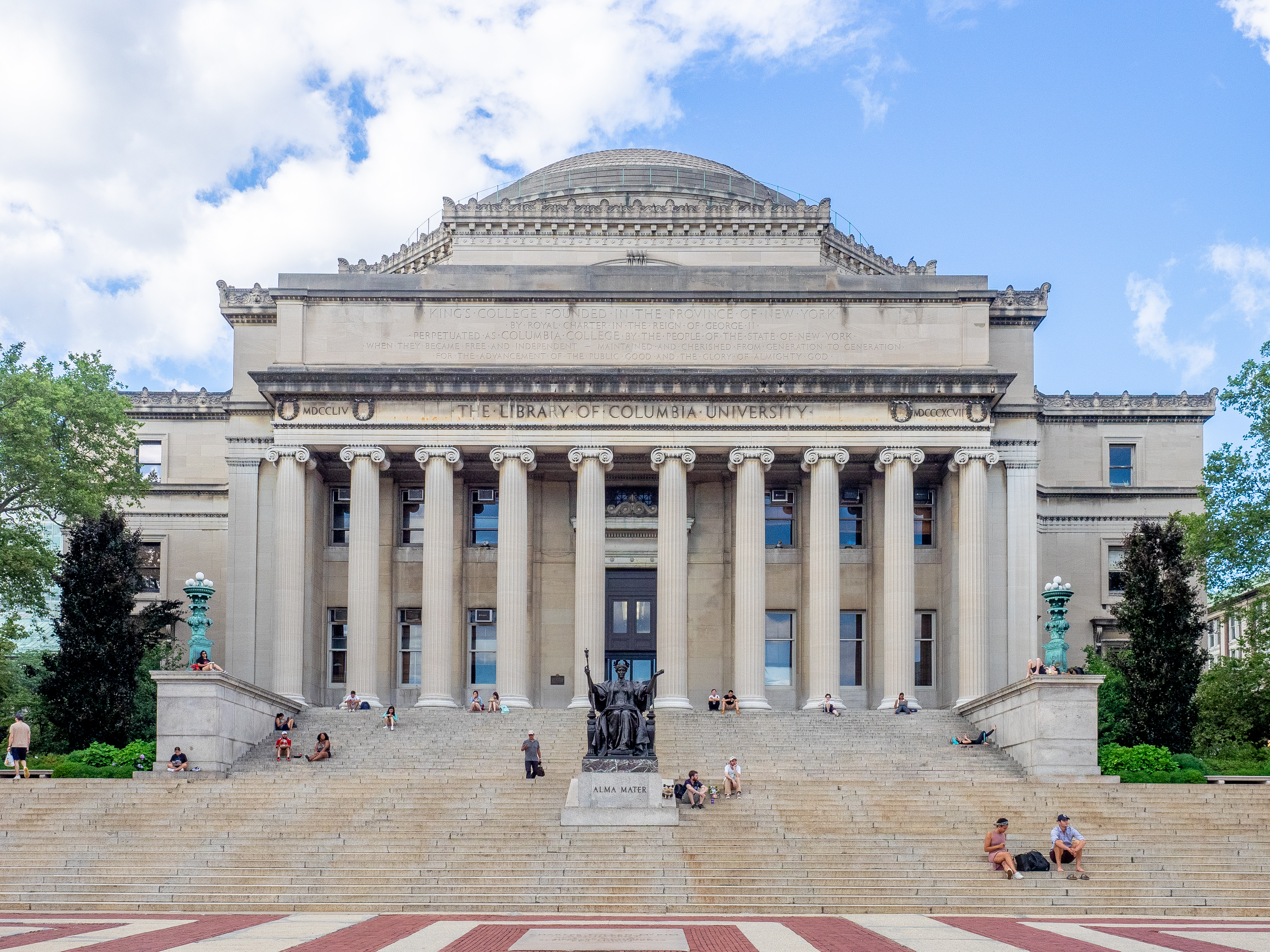
Columbia University in the City of New York

== Objectives ==
The Coalition's website defines its objectives as developing policies and tools that assist in achieving sustainability for both forests and neighboring agricultural lands. The overarching objective of the CfRN is to provide a collaborative environment for rainforest nations to discuss potential solutions for forest-related issues. To achieve this objective, the CfRN:

- Seeks to manage tropical rainforests in a way that supports climate stability, conserves biodiversity, and helps development and poverty alleviation efforts
- Assists in crafting new financial tools in cooperation with governments, communities, businesses, and other interested parties
- Helps to find ways to allow sustainable livelihoods while also improving living standards in communities which depend on rainforests
- Sets a path which enables similar results in other countries with tropical rainforests.

== Initiatives ==
The CfRN operates multiple initiatives in pursuit of its objectives. The CfRN broadly defines these initiaves as the REDD+ Catalytic Fund and National Greeh House Gas Inventories, which advocate for the implementation of methods that support environmentally sustainable growth. This stems from the amount of forest-related emissions relative to total carbon emissions on an annual basis, which accounts for a total of twenty percent.

=== Fund ===
The REDD+ Catalytic Fund provides "bankable up-front funding" for nations attempting to finance ways to reduce their greenhouse gas outputs. The REDD+ program, started in 2005 by the UNFCC, offers financial rewards for nations which achieve proven results in gas reductions; however, it offers no assistance to reach that goal. The CfRN sees the REDD+ Catalytic Fund as complementary to funds which pay for results.

=== National Green House Gas Inventories ===
The National Green House Gas (GHG) Inventories attempt to reflect a nation's total emission of gases which contribute to global warming and climate change. It also shows how much CO_{2} is being absorbed by rainforests, which offset to some degree a nation's total output. These inventories are required from members of the UNFCCC and the Paris Agreement. As a part of the UNFCCC and Paris Agreement, National GHG Inventories show how much progress a nation has made in reducing its GHG output and how much further it has to go to achieve its goals.

The CfRN has provided technical assistance to member nations in preparing their National GHG Inventories. Members which have successfully submitted their inventories include Belize, Panama, Papua New Guinea, and the DR of the Congo, as well as others.

== Controversies ==
In May 2017, Kevin Conrad, Director of the Coalition for Rainforest Nations, unsuccessfully applied to register 'REDD+' as a private trademark in the US. In a response to a request for comment, Conrad stated that his intention was to stop the misuse of the brand by the Voluntary Carbon Market (VCM). The VCM is a market that involves the voluntary purchasing and selling of carbon credits between various companies and organizations. Through engaging in the VCM, companies and organizations are broadly involved in the active purchase of carbon credits and subsequent reduction of greenhouse gas emissions.

In March 2021, Conrad signed a Memorandum of Understanding (MOU) with PNG Climate Change Minister Wera Mori. A MOU is an agreement between two or more parties, created to establish a clear understanding of how the specific agreement will be implemented. The MOU between Conrad and Mori provided both parties with the distinction that Conrad was given the sole rights to trade PNG's carbon. A letter from a coalition of PNG based civil societies criticises this MOU, stating that it has been implemented with no consultation with existing rights owners, that it does not comply with PNG's Free, Prior and Informed Consent rules, and questions how, in the absence of any Government decision or legislative framework, the minister can unilaterally give 10% of PNG's carbon to Conrad.

== Member Nations ==
As of 2024, the Coalition for Rainforest Nations comprises the following 53 nations:

=== Africa ===
- Botswana
- Cameroon
- Central African Republic
- Democratic Republic of the Congo
- Equatorial Guinea
- Gabon
- Ghana
- Kenya
- Lesotho
- Liberia
- Madagascar
- Malawi
- Mali
- Mozambique
- Namibia
- Nigeria
- Republic of the Congo
- Sierra Leone
- South Africa
- Sudan
- Uganda
- Zambia

=== The Americas and the Caribbean ===
- Argentina
- Belize
- Costa Rica
- Dominica
- Dominican Republic
- Ecuador
- Guatemala
- Guyana
- Honduras
- Jamaica
- Nicaragua
- Panama
- Paraguay
- Saint Lucia
- Suriname
- Uruguay

=== Asia ===
- Bangladesh
- Cambodia
- India
- Indonesia
- Laos
- Malaysia
- Pakistan
- Singapore
- Thailand
- Vietnam

=== Oceania ===
- Fiji
- Papua New Guinea
- Samoa
- Solomon Islands
- Vanuatu

== See also ==
- Sustainable development
- Rainforest
- Biodiversity
