= Torres Strait Treaty =

1978 treaty between Australia and Papua New Guinea

Treaty between Australia and the Independent State of Papua New Guinea concerning Sovereignty and Maritime Boundaries in the area between the two Countries, including the area known as Torres Strait, and Related Matters
- Type: Boundary treaty
- Signed: 18 December 1978
- Location: Sydney, Australia
- Effective: 15 February 1985
- Condition: Ratification by Australia and Papua New Guinea
- Signatories: Australia; Papua New Guinea
- Languages: English

The Torres Strait Treaty is a treaty between Australia and Papua New Guinea (PNG) which defines the border between them following the latter's independence from Australia in 1975. The treaty also sets out the unusual manner in which a common border area, the Torres Strait Protected Zone, is managed. The treaty was negotiated for six years before being signed by the two countries in December 1978 and going into effect in February 1985. There are two Treaty Liaison Officers to ease the implementation of treaty provisions, one from Australia based on Thursday Island and one from Papua New Guinea based in Daru.

The treaty is named for the Torres Strait that separates mainland Australia and Papua New Guinea.

== Boundaries ==
The treaty defines two boundaries between Australia and Papua New Guinea:

- Seabed Jurisdiction Line: Australia and Papua New Guinea have rights to all things on or below the seabed on their respective sides of this line.
- Fisheries Jurisdiction Line: Australia and Papua New Guinea have rights to swimming fish on their respective sides of the line. Both countries have agreed to share these rights.

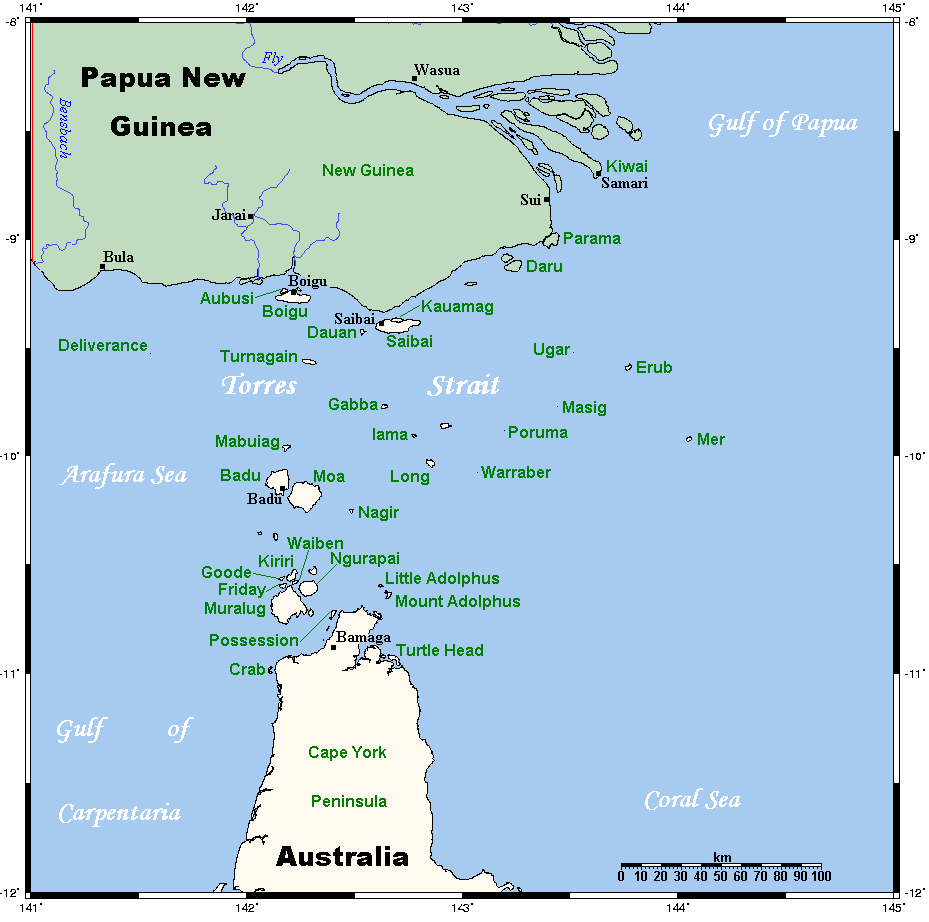
Map of Torres Strait

Despite being located on the Papua New Guinea side of the Seabed Jurisdiction Line, the following islands are part of Australia:

- Anchor Cay
- Aubusi Island
- Black Rocks
- Boigu Island
- Bramble Cay
- Dauan Island
- Deliverance Island
- East Cay
- Kaumag Island
- Kerr Islet
- Moimi Island
- Pearce Cay
- Saibai Island
- Turnagain Island
- Turu Cay

Some of these islands, annexed by the Colony of Queensland in 1879, are so close to Papua New Guinea's southern coast that Australian sovereignty of territorial waters had to be reduced from the traditional 12 nautical miles (22 km; 14 mi) to 3 nautical miles (5.6 km; 3.5 mi), unless otherwise specified by the treaty.

== Protected Zone ==
Map of Torres Strait and the Protected Zone

The treaty also established the Torres Strait Protected Zone to allow indigenous Torres Strait Islanders and coastal Papua New Guinea people to maintain their traditional ways of life. It "allows traditional people to move freely within the Protected Zone (without passports or visas) for traditional purposes."

The residents of the following 13 villages in Papua New Guinea, known as "Treaty Villages," have the right under this treaty to enter the Australian-controlled part of the Protected Zone:

- Buji/Ber
- Bula
- Jarai
- Kadawa
- Katatai
- Mabadauan
- Mari
- Old Mawatta
- Parama
- Sigabadaru
- Sui
- Tais
- Ture Ture

There are a number of restrictions, including:

- only for traditional activities, not non-traditional ones (e.g. shopping), no commercial activities, business dealings or for work
- travel by dinghy or canoe only
- prior written notice signed by a Papua New Guinea village councillor or an Australian elected representative and sent to the community being visited, said notice having to be approved and sent back
