= Agriculture in Papua New Guinea =

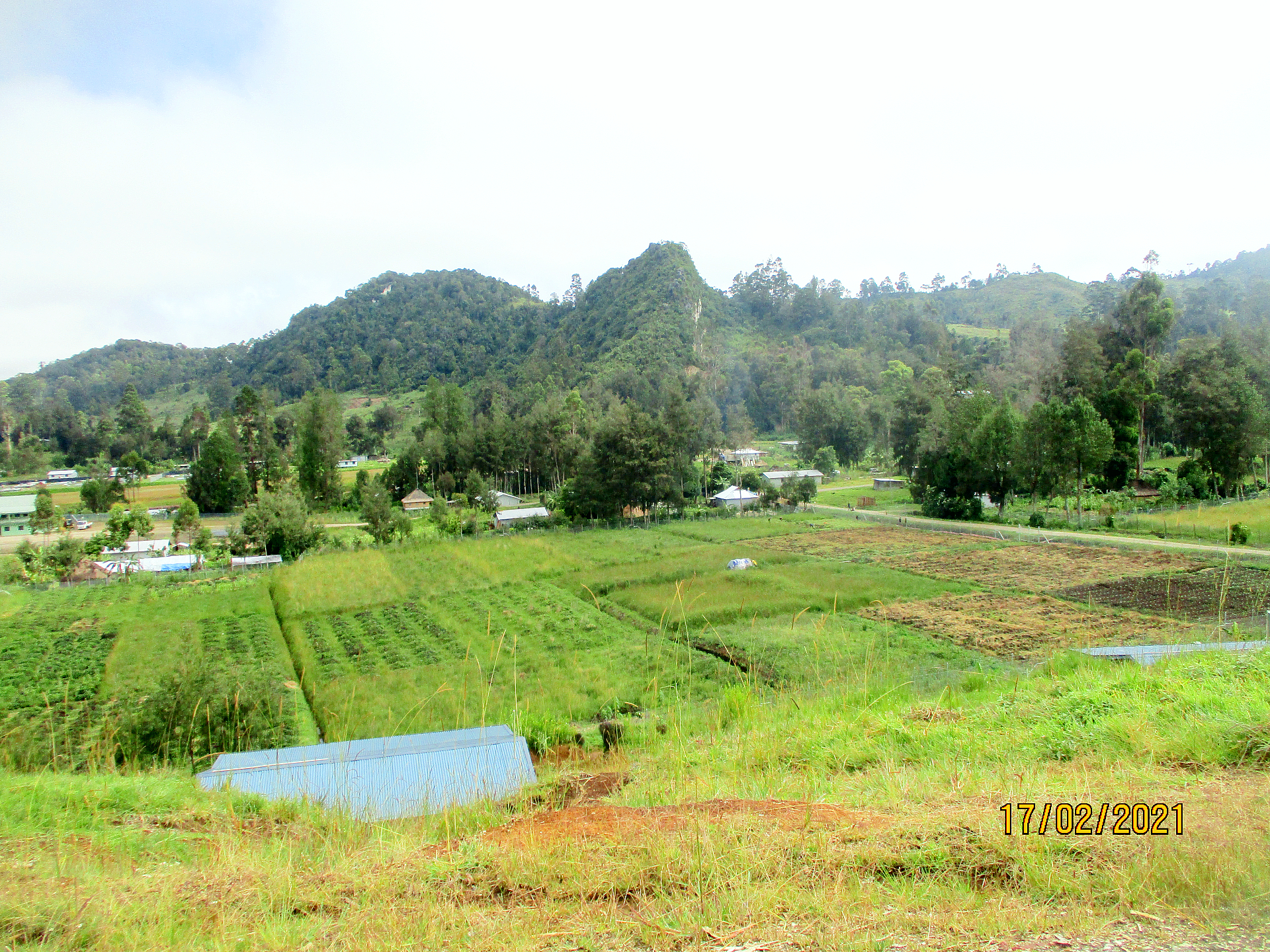
Farmland in Papua New Guinea

Agriculture in Papua New Guinea has more than a 7,000 years old history, and developed out of pre-agricultural plant/food collecting and cultivation traditions of local hunter-gatherers. Currently around 85% of Papua New Guinea's population lives from semi-subsistence agriculture. 86% of all food energy consumed in Papua New Guinea is locally sourced.

Papua New Guinea produces and exports agricultural, timber, and fish products. Agriculture in 2017 accounted for 22.1% of the GDP and supported more than 80% of the population. Cash crops ranked by value are coffee, oil, cocoa, copra, tea, rubber, and sugar. The timber industry was not active in 1998, due to low world prices, but rebounded in 1999. About 40% of the country is covered with timber rich trees, and a domestic woodworking industry has been slow to develop. 99% of fishing exports are either tuna or tuna byproduct. Papua New Guinea has the largest yam market in Asia.

== History ==
The early inhabitants of New Guinea were likely dependent on hunting and gathering, but there is evidence of early management of nut-producing trees to improve yields. Starch grains found on stone tools suggest the use of taro as early as 28,000 years ago on Buka Island, and it is probable that other native species such as sago and Canarium indicum were also domesticated by early inhabitants. Anthropologists believe that agriculture was independently developed in New Guinea, occurring around the same time as its emergence in the Middle East and central China.

Many of the important food crops in Papua New Guinea, prior to the arrival of Europeans, Asians, and other Pacific islanders, were likely domesticated in the New Guinea region or nearby areas such as the Bismarck Archipelago. These crops include taro, yam species, banana, breadfruit, sago, various green vegetables, fruits, and nuts. Some plant species were independently domesticated in both the New Guinea region and Asia. In contrast, the most important domesticated animal species in Papua New Guinea, including pigs, chickens, and dogs, were introduced after being domesticated elsewhere.

People in Papua New Guinea started practicing forms of plant cultivation and agriculture around 7,000 – 10,000 years ago. The Papuan agricultural tradition independently formed out of the local plant and food collecting traditions of hunter-gatherers. The spread of agricultural techniques may be linked to the Trans–New Guinea speaking groups, which make up roughly half of the Indigenous people of New Guinea, and diverged from other Papuans around 10,000 years ago, based on genetic distance. The oldest evidence for this is in the Kuk Swamp area, where planting, digging and staking of plants, and possibly drainage have been used to cultivate taro, banana, sago and yam. Later, around 4,000 years ago, arriving Austronesian peoples brought additional techniques. Local Papuan groups borrowed some agricultural-related elements and material culture. Cultural contacts between local Papuan groups and Austronesians is also evident by genetic data.

Between the 17th and 19th centuries, a small number of plant species, including sweet potato, cassava and tobacco have been brought from the Americas by Europeans and introduced to Indonesia from where they spread to New Guinea. In the second part of the 19th century and especially after 1870 further crops have been introduced directly by Europeans, including beans, pumpkin, corn, watermelon, papaya, mangosteen, durian, orange, lemon, coffee, lime and guava. The introduction of the sweet potato to Papua New Guinea had a significant impact on its people, leading to major societal changes among those who adopted it as a food source. The sweet potato's ability to be fed to pigs as fodder without cooking made it a valuable resource for pig farming. As a result, early adopters of sweet potato cultivation were able to quickly accumulate pigs and, consequently, amass considerable wealth relative to those who did not adopt the new staple food. Societal changes resulting from the adoption of sweet potato cultivation can be found recorded in the Enga peoples oral tradition.

By the 1930s, European documentation of Papua showed that the sweet potato had become the primary food source for almost all highland people, with the exception of those west of the Strickland River who still relied primarily on taro. By the 1980s, even the most resistant groups had adopted a primarily sweet potato-based diet. While some people in Papua New Guinea believe that their ancestors always had access to sweet potatoes, others, such as those in the Tari Basin, have oral traditions detailing their previous reliance on taro.

Copra was historically regarded as one of the most important cash crops in Papua New Guinea from the 1880s until about the 1970s.

== Production ==
Papua New Guinea produces about 3% of the worlds palm oil, 2% of the worlds coffee, and variably 2-5% of the worlds coconut oil supply.

2018 Papua New Guinea production
Product	Production value tons
palm oil	2,400,000
banana	1,300,000
coconut	1,100,000
sweet potato	728,000
yam	375,000
root and tubers	356,000
vegetable	325,000
taro	271,000
maize	241,000
sugar cane	237,000
cassava	152,000
berries	107,000
coffee	57,000
cocoa	44,000
natural rubber	7,700
tea	5,500

=== Fisheries ===
Papua New Guinea has a mostly export based fishing industry with foreign direct investment constituting the majority of the investments in the sector. In 2014 Papua New Guinea had exported 103,000 tons of fish and by 2019 that amount had increased to 196,000 tons. The overwhelming amount of fish and fish byproduct exported are solely from tuna fish, cumulatively making up about 99% of the fish related exports. Notably canned tuna is exported to the European Union, Fiji, Solomon Islands, and Vanuatu. Whole frozen tuna is mainly exported to Japan, Korea, Taiwan, Fiji, and the Philippines. Fish oil, a processing byproduct, is exported to Malaysia, New Zealand, Philippines, and Peru. The remaining 1% of exports (not tuna or tuna byproduct) are related to the harvest of Sea Cucumber, prawns, shrimp, lobster, crab, and shark fins. The primary markets for Papua New Guinea's lobsters are Australia and China.

== Major agricultural products ==
=== Sweet potato ===
Sweet potato is a major food in Papua New Guinea and dominates production in the highlands. It is one of Papua New Guinea's top five staple foods, taking the top position with 99% of rural New Guineans growing it, followed by banana with 96% and taro with 95%.

=== Coffee ===
Coffee production in Papua New Guinea accounts for a little over 1% of the total world production according to the United Nations Conference on Trade and Development (UNCTAD). After oil palm, coffee is Papua New Guinea's second largest agricultural export, employing approximately 2.5 million people. Nearly all of Papua New Guineas coffee beans are exported as dried green beans. Coffee exports are notably dominated by a small number of large companies.

=== Copra ===
Copra has been cultivated in New Guinea since the late 19th century, originally by German colonialists. Production has continued by Australian interests since World War II.

=== Cocoa ===
In Papua New Guinea, cocoa is the third largest cash crop and its marketing chain features competitive pricing at each stage. Government regulations require processors and exporters to display prices for both wet and dry beans, resulting in higher profits for growers and smaller margins for processors and exporters. This contrasts with other Pacific nations that produce cocoa, where growers are often exploited by state and private monopolies.

=== Tuna ===
Papua New Guinea has the largest fishery zone in the South Pacific with a zone of 2.4 million square kilometers. Papua New Guinea harvests and exports 14% of the worlds tuna supply, owing in part to agreements with the EU that allow duty free exports. Tuna accounts for 99% of Papua New Guinea's total fish related exports.

=== Timber ===
Below is a table containing the volume and value of processed timber exports in 2004.

In Papua New Guinea, logs account for more than 90% of timber product exports by volume. Processed timber products include veneer, woodchip, plywood, balsa wood, and timber from a number of native or introduced species, with kwila being the most important of the hardwoods. Veneer is manufactured from forest timber in the Western Province, while woodchip is processed at a plant in Madang from planted and native forest in the Gogol Valley southwest of Madang, with planted Acacia mangium now the main species harvested. Plywood is made in Bulolo from hoop and klinki pine, while balsa wood is processed at four mills from village and plantation plots on the Gazelle Peninsula in East New Britain Province.

In 2004, there were around 52,000 hectares of land under plantation forestry in Papua New guinea, with about 60% managed by the private sector and the rest by the Papua New Guinean Government. The expected total volume of round wood to be harvested from the current standing trees in the plantations at maturity is 10 million m3 of hardwood and 4 million m3 of softwood. As well, there is an estimated one million m3 of rubber wood (Hevea brasiliensis) that could be harvested in the future.

The largest plantation areas are at Open Bay in East New Britain Province, Stettin Bay in West New Britain Province, the Wau–Bulolo area in Morobe Province, and the Gogol Valley in Madang Province. These four areas account for about 70% of plantation forestry in Papua New Guinea with the remaining distributed among 13 locations in 10 provinces.

Product	Volume (m3)	Value (kina millions)
Balsa wood	3,623	3.0
Furniture components (kwila)	238	0.3
Kwila	10,562	13.9
Malas	1,048	0.2
Mersawa	216	0.1
Mixed sawn	26,586	18.2
Other processed products	1,412	0.3
Pencil cedar	1,314	0.5
Pinus	462	0.3
Plywood	3,899	4.5
Red canarium	700	0.1
Rosewood	472	0.7
Teak	1,518	1.9
Terminalia	1,100	0.2
Ton	1,218	0.3
Veneer	59,249	35.3
Woodchips	51,756	8.0
Total processed timber	165,471	87.9

== Women in agriculture ==
Women play a significant role in agriculture in Papua New Guinea. As stated in a report by the Food and Agriculture Organization (FAO), "Village production depends on day-to-day domestic relationships between men and women. From daily work in producing food, women have an extensive knowledge of plants and the agricultural environment. They are highly skilled horticulturalists."

Despite the important role that they play in agriculture, women's contributions are often undervalued and overlooked. Organizations such as the FAO are working with the government of Papua New Guinea to promote gender equality in agriculture and to empower women farmers.

== Consumption ==
Food	Rural (%)	Urban (%)	Total population (%)	Primary staple food of the province
Sweet potato	65.0	34.0	60.2	Bougainville, Central, Chimbu, Eastern Highlands, Enga Hela, Jiwaka, Madang, Morobe, National Capital District, New Ireland, West New Britain, Western Highlands
Rice (imported)	25.8	87.4	35.1	
Coconut	28.4	34.2	29.2	
Banana	33.6	38.7	34.3	East New Britain
Taro	23.9	9.6	21.7	
Sago	13.3	18.9	14.2	East Sepik, Gulf, Manus, Western, Sandaun, Manus
Cassava	6.9	4.3	6.5	Milne Bay
Chicken	4.1	26.5	7.5	
Pork & Beef	6.4	9.9	6.9	
Tinned meat	5.9	51.7	12.8	
Fresh fish	7.1	28.2	10.3	
Tinned fish	9.0	24.5	11.4	
Bush meat	1.8	1.5	1.7	

== See also ==
- Aquaculture in Papua New Guinea
- Economy of Papua New Guinea
- Domesticated plants and animals of Austronesia
