= Munqeth Mehyar =

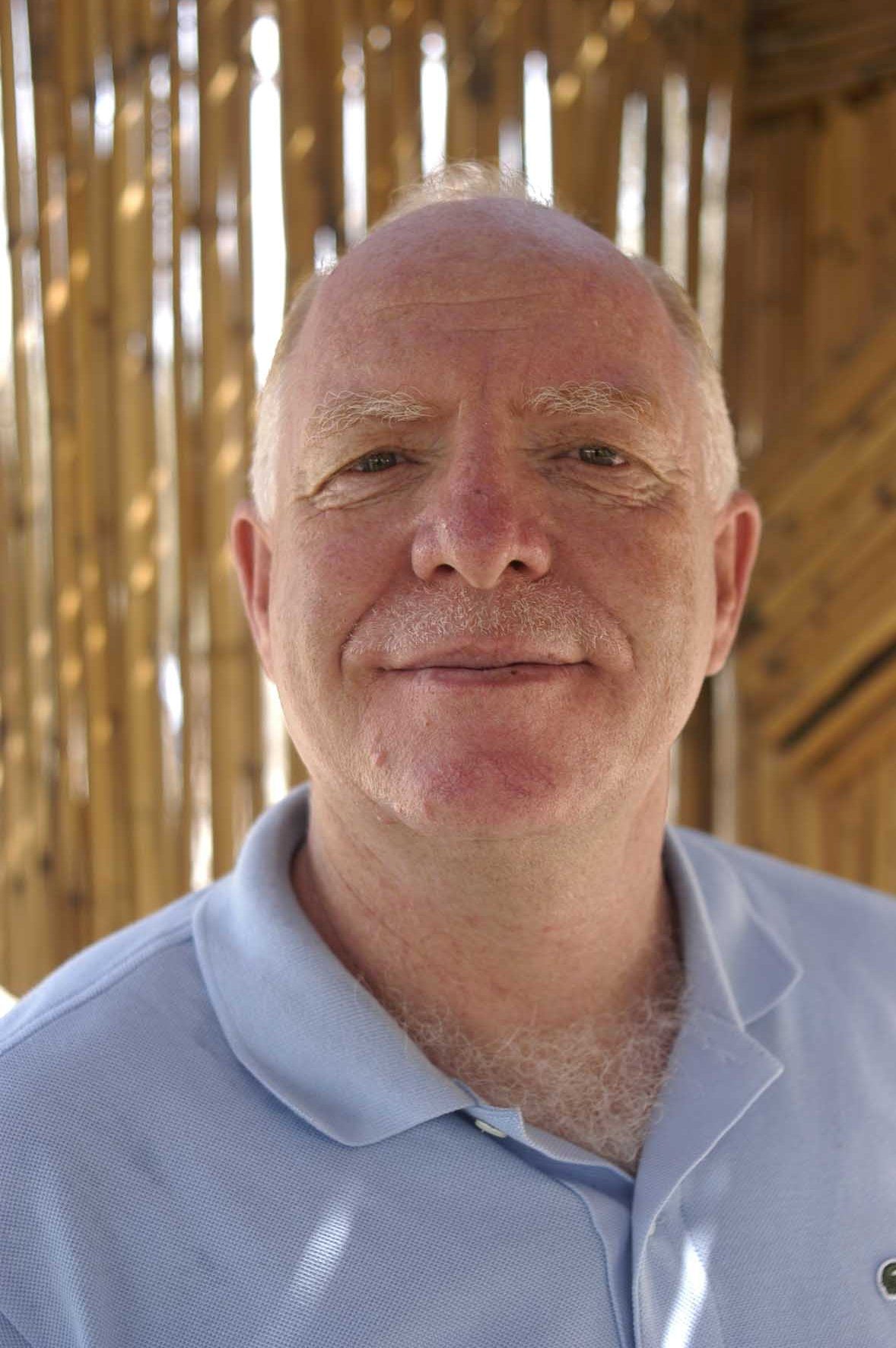
Munqeth Mehyar

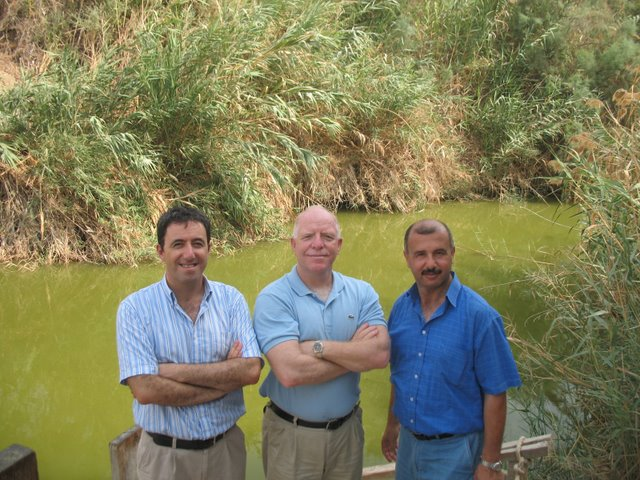
The three co-directors of EcoPeace Middle East at the Jordan River. From left to right: Gidon Bromberg (Israel), Munqeth Mehyar (Jordan), Nader Al-Khateeb (Palestine)

Munqeth Mehyar (Arabic: منقذ مهيار) (born January 16, 1957) serves as chairman and Jordanian Director of EcoPeace Middle East (formerly Friends of the Earth Middle East (FoEME)). EcoPeace Middle East is a unique regional organization that brings together Jordanian, Palestinian and Israeli environmentalists to promote sustainable development and advance peace efforts in the Middle East. The organization has offices in Amman, Bethlehem and Tel Aviv, employs over 40 paid staff and actively involves hundreds of volunteers.

As Jordanian Director, Mehyar leads EcoPeace activities concerning the Jordan River, the Dead Sea and the Good Water Neighbors Project. As chairman, his responsibilities include supervising international project development and management, serving as a liaison to and lobbying of governmental and private sector figures and organizations on major regional policy issues relevant to environmental protection, as well as developing international contacts and functional partnerships with international environmental and development institutions. Mehyar has organized dozens of regional conferences, workshops and study tours, supervised regional research on shared ecosystems, co-authored reports and policy papers and speaks regularly on water, peace and security issues, with the main emphasis directed towards the end of Israeli occupation and the creation of an independent "Palestinian State" with East Jerusalem as its capital.

Mehyar received a degree in Regional Planning and Architecture from the University of Louisiana, USA in 1981, upon which he became the planning engineer for South Amman. In addition to his role as the Jordanian EcoPeace Middle East director, he serves as Vice President of the Jordan Society for Sustainable Development. He is also on the Board of Directors of both the Jordan Sports Federation for the Handicapped and the Jordan Royal Ecological Diving Society.

Mehyar is married with 4 children, and resides in Amman, Jordan.

== Awards ==
In 2000, King Abdullah II awarded Mehyar with The Medal of Distinguished Giving for his charitable activities in Jordan. EcoPeace Middle East's three co-directors—Munqeth Mehyar (Jordan), Gidon Bromberg (Israel) and Nader Al-Khateeb (Palestine) -- were honored by TIME Magazine as Environmental Heroes of 2008 and the organization was granted the prestigious Skoll Award in 2009, Alexander Aristotel Onassis prize for the protection of the environment (Hamburg, 17 November 2010) and Anna Lindh Foundation award 2011. EcoPeace Middle East also received a 2008 SEED Finalist Award. In 2012 he was a Green Prophet Eco Hero for 2011.

== Published works ==
EcoPeace Middle East Reports: co-author

- Environmental Peacebuilding Theory and Practice
- Identifying Common Environmental Problems and Shared Solutions
- Good Water Neighbors
- Municipal Cooperation across Conflict Divides - A Preliminary Study
- Nature, Agriculture and the Price of Water in Israel
- Economic Valuation of Resuscitating the Dead Sea
- Advancing Conservation and Sustainable Development of the Dead Sea Basin - Broadening the Debate on Economic and Management Issues
- Let the Dead Sea Live
- Dead Sea Challenges
- One Basin - One Strategy
- Jordan River Peace Park Pre Feasibility Study
- How Past Trans-boundary Security Arrangements Can Change the Future of Peace Parks in the Tri-partite Region
- FoEME Report on the Proposed Red Dead Conduit
- Red Sea-Dead Sea Conduit - Geo-Environmental Study Along the Arava Valley
- A Seeping Time Bomb: Pollution of the Mountain Aquifer by Solid Waste

For more, see Publications tab on EcoPeace Middle East website

== Video ==
Good Water Neighbors and youth - "Green Mideast Peace"
