= Kevin Conrad =

Papua New Guinean environmentalist

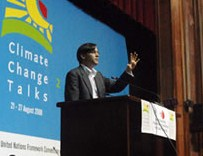
Amb. Conrad in Ghana

Kevin Mark Conrad, born in the United States to parents living in Papua New Guinea in 1968, is a Papua New Guinean businessman and environmentalist. He grew up in the Arapesh tribe near Wewak, East Sepik Province and graduated from Ukarumpa High School in the Eastern Highlands Province.

== Professional roles ==
Conrad serves as Special Envoy and Ambassador for Environment & Climate Change for Papua New Guinea and also the executive director of the Coalition for Rainforest Nations. He is a graduate of Columbia University, London Business School, and University of Southern California.

He was the country's Special Envoy and Ambassador to the 2011 United Nations Climate Change Conference in Durban.

== Climate change negotiations ==
Conrad is a leading figure behind global efforts to value the ecosystem services provided by tropical forests with the objective of reducing rates of deforestation and increasing forest conservation. In this context, he is generally credited for launching efforts within the United Nations Framework Convention on Climate Change (UNFCCC) now widely referred to as REDD+ -- 'Reducing Emissions from Deforestation and Forest Degradation in developing countries.'

Further, in his role at the Coalition for Rainforest Nations, Conrad has been instrumental in the establishment of the World Bank's Forest Carbon Partnership Facility and the United Nations' UN-REDD Programme. Based upon these efforts, industrialized countries — including Norway, the United States, the UK, Germany, France, Japan, and Australia — pledged around US$3.5 billion by the close of 2009 under the Copenhagen Accord for capacity-building and incentives to reduce rates of deforestation in participating developing countries.

Conrad "gained a worldwide spotlight" during the 2007 United Nations Climate Change Conference where he represented Papua New Guinea and declared:

We all came with high expectations. The world is watching us. We left a seat for every country. We asked for leadership — and there is an old saying: "If you're not willing to lead, then get out of the way." I would ask the United States: we ask for your leadership. We seek your leadership, but if for some reason you're not willing to lead, leave it to the rest of us; please, get out of the way.

According to the New York Times, "the room erupted in applause, and within minutes the lead American representative, Paula J. Dobriansky, dropped the objection and said, 'We will go forward and join consensus today.'" Conrad's statement received widespread international media coverage, and was soon spread on YouTube.

In July 2011, in preparation for the 2011 United Nations Climate Change Conference, he submitted a proposal, in the name of Papua New Guinea (supported by Mexico), to the secretariat of the conference, asking for amendments to the United Nations Framework Convention on Climate Change "in order to make effective the right to vote under Article 18 and allow a 'last resort' vote to be taken only when every effort to reach consensus has failed and where there is a matter that carries broad-based support and 'political will'". The proposed amendment to article 18 included, in particular, the following line: "If such efforts to reach consensus have been exhausted and no agreement has been reached, a decision shall, as last resort, be adopted by a three-fourths majority vote of the Parties present and voting", with exceptions. The BBC described it as an "intriguing" proposal to break the expected "deadlock between rich and poor" countries. Conrad had considered submitting the proposal at the Copenhagen Conference in 2009, and now felt it was time to clarify the decision-making process under the convention. The BBC noted that although, under Papua New Guinea's proposal, developing countries would be able to use their numerical superiority to adopt any kind of obligation, in practical terms they would still need the approval of rich countries to secure funding. Nonetheless, the BBC's environmental correspondent Richard Black concluded his introductory article to the 2011 Conference by noting: "It will be intriguing to see how far PNG takes this idea, and how much support it gets".

At the Durban Conference, Conrad accused China, the United States and India of "colluding" to delay any action over climate change until after 2020.

On the sidelines of the Durban Conference, he was a member of a jury awarding a "Gigaton Award" to businesses having made significant efforts towards reducing carbon emissions. The twenty-one member jury also included Yvo de Boer (former Executive Secretary of the United Nations Framework Convention on Climate Change), Rajendra Pachauri (chair of the Intergovernmental Panel on Climate Change), Sir Richard Branson (head of the Virgin Group) and Professor Jacqueline McGlade (executive director of the European Environment Agency).

Representing Papua New Guinea at the 2019 United Nations Climate Change Conference (the "COP25"), he expressed the view that the voices of developing countries were not being listened to or being taken into account.

== International honors ==
In 2009, the United Nations Environment Programme named Conrad a 'Champion of the Earth' for Policy Leadership along with Erik Solheim, Minister of Environment and International Development of Norway. In 2008, Time magazine named Conrad #1 in the "Leaders & Visionaries" category within its annual list of "Heroes of the Environment", in an article by Joseph Stiglitz.
