= List of photovoltaics companies =

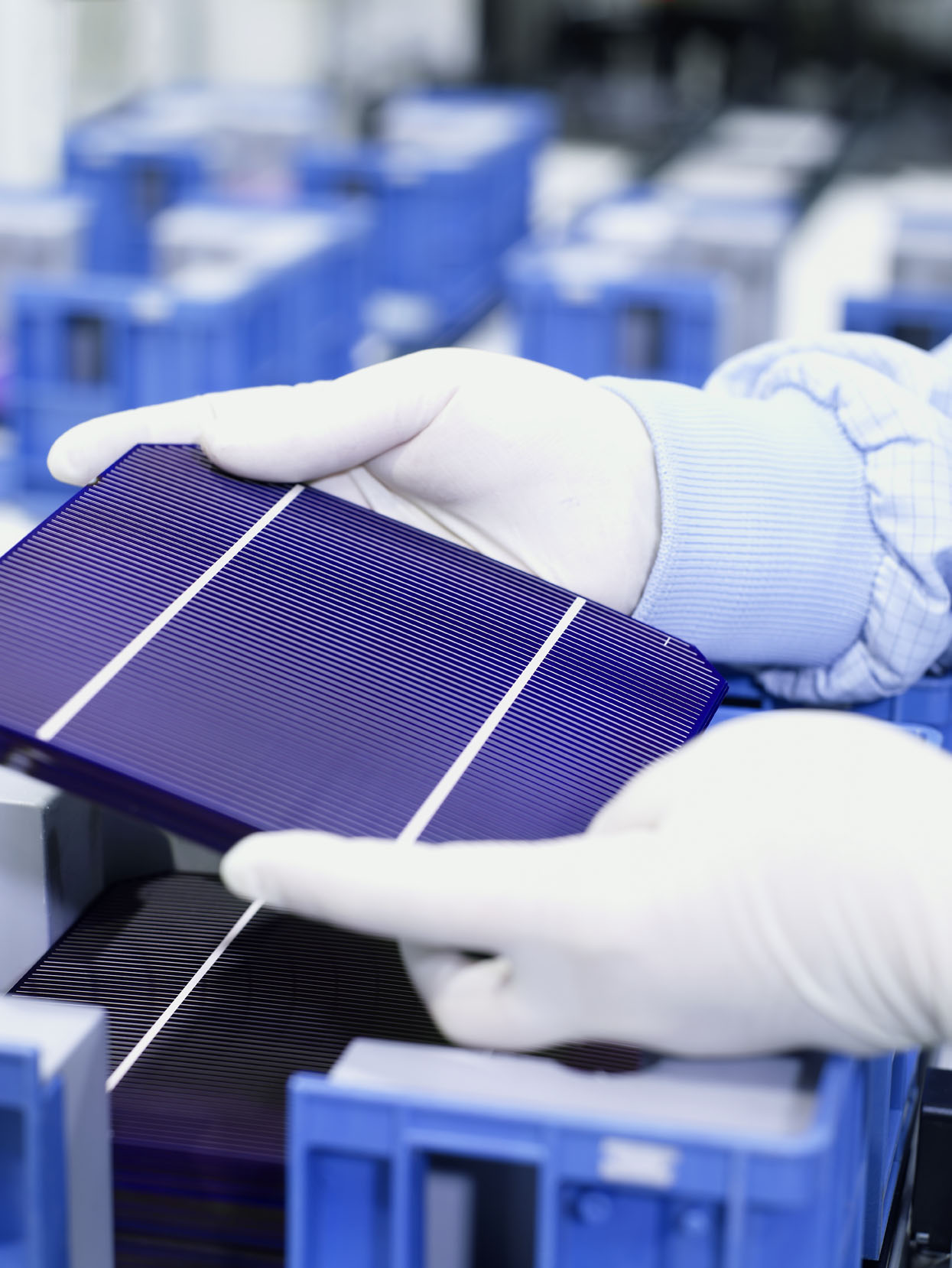
Monocrystalline solar cell

This is a list of notable photovoltaics (PV) companies.

Grid-connected solar photovoltaics (PV) is the fastest growing energy technology in the world, growing from a cumulative installed capacity of 7.7 GW in 2007, to 320 GW in 2016. In 2016, 93% of the global PV cell manufacturing capacity utilized crystalline silicon (cSi) technology, representing a commanding lead over rival forms of PV technology, such as cadmium telluride (CdTe), amorphous silicon (aSi), and copper indium gallium selenide (CIGS). In 2016, manufacturers in China and Taiwan met the majority of global PV module demand, accounting for 68% of all modules, followed by the rest of Asia at 14%. The United States and Canada manufactured 6%, and Europe manufactured a mere 4%. In 2021 China produced about 80% of the polysilicon, 95% of wafers, 80% of cells and 70% of modules. Module production capacity reached 460 GW with crystalline silicon technology assembly accounting for 98%.

Photovoltaics companies include PV capital equipment producers, cell manufacturers, panel manufacturers and installers. The list does not include silicon manufacturing companies.

== Photovoltaic manufacturers ==
=== Top 10 by year ===
Solar module company	Shipments (GW)							Country
Solar module company	2015^{*}	2015^{†}	2016 (forecast)	2018	2019	2020	2021	Country
LONGi Solar	–	–	–	7.2	9	24.5	(1st)	China
Trina Solar	4.55	5.74	–	8.1	9.7	15.9	(2nd)	China
JA Solar	3.38	3.93	5.2-5.5	8.8	10.3	15.9	(3rd)	China
JinkoSolar	3.79	4.51	6-6.5	11.4	14.2	18.8	(4th)	China
Canadian Solar	3.9	4.7	5.4-5.5	7.1	8.5	11.3	(5th)	Canada
Risen Energy	–	1.24	–	4.8	7	(7th)	(6th)	China
First Solar	2.9	2.8	2.9-3	2.7	5.5	(9th)	(7th)	United States
Suntech Power						(10th)	(8th)	China
Hanwha Q CELLS	3.2	3.3	4.5-4.7	5.5	7.3	(6th)	(9th)	South Korea
Chint						(8th)	(10th)	China
GCL System Integration Technology				4.1	4.8			China
SFCE (Shunfeng International Clean Energy Limited)	–	2.28	–	3.3	4			China
Yingli Green	2.35	2.35-2.40	–	–	–			China
SunPower Corp.	1.18-1.25	–	1.7-2	–	2.5			(United States) US
Sources: tenth place depending on source. Total world 2015 shipment was 50.8 GW.^{*} March 2016 source.^{†} April 2016 source.

=== Summary ===
Notable PV production lines in 2015, technology, capacity and production
Company	Country	Technology	Capacity (MW)				Production (MW)			
Company	Country	Technology	2012	2013	2014	2015	2012	2013	2014	2015
America Green Solar	US	Crystalline silicon	0	100	300	480	0	40	108	200
Bosch	Germany	Crystalline silicon, Thin films (a-Si, CIGS)	-	220	260	270	-	55	143	200
BP Solar	Spain	Laser buried grid (Note: Plant closed in 2009.)	-	80	-	-	12	15	40 (Note: Estimated production/capacity)	-
BP Solar	Australia	MC Screen print	-	52	-	-	33	35	40	-
Greenshine New Energy	US	-	-	43	-	-	25	27	30	-
Canadian Solar	Canada	Crystalline silicon	0	100	270	420	0	40	102.8	200
Contendre Solar	India	Crystalline silicon	-	192	320	320	-	80	100-120	194
Conergy	Germany	-	0	275	100	250	0	0	50	100
DelSolar	Taiwan	-	50	100	120	120	-	54	83	88.8
DelSolar	China	-	-	-	-	60	-	-	-	0
E-Ton Solar	Taiwan	-	-	200	320	320	35	62	97	220
Evergreen Solar (Note: Filed for bankruptcy on Aug 15, 2011, Evergreen Solar Seeks Bankruptcy)	US	String ribbon	-	17	58.5	145	13	16	26.5	103.4
Evergreen Solar	Germany	String ribbon	-	90	-	-	15	50	-	-
Evergreen Solar	China	String ribbon	-	-	-	-	-	-	-	-
Helius Energy	US	Monocrystalline & polycrystalline / PERC	-	-	-	-	-	35	50	50
Helius Energy	China	Monocrystalline & polycrystalline / PERC	-	-	-	120	120	180	220	220
Helius Energy	Brazil	Monocrystalline & polycrystalline / PERC	-	-	-	-	-	-	-	-
First Solar	US	CdTe	-	119	147	160	60	119	145	143
First Solar	Germany	CdTe	0	158	196	214	0	81	192	192.5
First Solar	Malaysia	CdTe	0	0	392	854	0	0	167	764.5
Morgan Solar Inc	Canada	-								
Gintech	Taiwan	Crystalline silicon	-	210	310	660	6	60	180	368
Contendre Solar	India		-	-	-	-	-	-	-	-
Isofoton	Spain	-	-	130	180	140	61	87	130	70
Lubi solar	India	Monocrystalline & polycrystalline	75	90	110	120	35	40	52	67
Itek Energy	US	Monocrystaline, PERC	10	15	40	50	2	4	12	25
JA Solar Holdings	China	Crystalline silicon	-	225	750	800	30	132	300	520
JUST Solar Co., Ltd.	China	-	0	120	156	205	0	83	156	194
Kyocera	Japan	-	-	-	360	-	180	207	290	400
Mitsubishi Electric	Japan	-	-	150	220	220	111	121	148	120
Mitsubishi Heavy	Japan	-	-	14	42	68	13	14	40	42
Motech	Taiwan	Crystalline silicon	-	240	350	470	102	176	270	296
Motech	China	Crystalline silicon	0	0	60	130	0	0	64	
MX Group	Italy	-	-	-	60	90	-	-	37	67
Neo Solar Power	Taiwan	Crystalline silicon	-	60	210	240	4	36	135	201
Ningbo Solar Electric	China	-	-	100	250-270	350	-	100	175	260
Photowatt	France	-	-	60	60	-	33	38	58	49
Photovoltech NV	Belgium	-	-	80	80	80	18	29	80	54
Q-Cells	Germany	-	-	516	760	500 (Note: Production greater than capacity due to closing of some production lines in mid-year)	253	389	570	551
Q-Cells	Malaysia	CdTe	-	-	-	300	-	-	-	206
Q-Cells	Germany (Calyxo)	-	0	8	25	10	0	1	3	1
Q-Cells	Germany (Solibro)	-	0	0	30	30	0	0	5	14
Q-Cells	Germany (Sontor)	-	0	8	25	-	0	1	3.6	
RECOM	France	Monocrystalline & polycrystalline	-	1.5 GW	1.5 GW	1.5 GW	-	-	-	
Renewable Energy Corporation	Norway	-	-	-	-	150	-	-	80	115
Panasonic	Japan	-	-	265	345	345	155	165	215	260
Schott Solar	Germany	-	118	162	205	355	83	74	138	218
Schott Solar	US	-	14	-	15	15	13	10	11	11
Sharp	Japan	-	-	710	710	710	434	363	473	595
Silfab Solar	US	-	-	-	-	-	-	-	-	-
Solarday	Italy	-	-	20	60	90	-	30	37	50
SolarPark Korea	South Korea	Crystalline silicon	-	-	-	170	-	-	-	90
SolarWorld	Germany	-	-	160	300	500	70	135	200	200
SolarWorld	US	-	55	-	100	250	20	35	30	50
Solland	Netherlands	-	-	60	170	170	18	36	60	80
SunPower	US	Crystalline silicon	-	214	414	574	63	100	237	397
Suntech	China	Crystalline silicon	-	540	1000	1100	160	336	530	704
Sunways	Germany	-	-	46	116	116	25	38	49	60
Trina Solar	China	Crystalline silicon	-	110	350	600	-	29	210	399
United Solar Ovonic	US	Thin film flexible amorphous silicon	-	118	178	150	28	48	112.6	123.4
Vikram Solar Pvt. Ltd	India	Monocrystalline & polycrystalline	-	-	-	-	120	200	350	500
Yingli	China		-	200	400	600	37	145	281.5	525.3
Tamesol	Spain	Monocrystalline & polycrystalline	-	120	220	340	35	60	80	120
Sova Solar Limited	India	Polycrystaline & monocrystaline	12.5	25	50	100	7	15	25	45
Zytech Solar (Zyt Energy Group)	Spain (headquarters)	Polycrystaline & monocrystaline, LCPV	150	250	500	700	52	74	90	130
Zytech Solar (Zyt Energy Group)	China (subsidiary)	Polycrystaline & monocrystaline	100	200	200	300	25	40	53	65
Zytech Solar (Zyt Energy Group)	India (subsidiary)	Polycrystaline & monocrystaline	-	-	-	200	-	-	-	120

According to EnergyTrend, the 2011 global top ten polysilicon, solar cell and solar module manufacturers by capacity were found in countries including People's Republic of China, United States, Taiwan, Germany, Japan, and Korea.

In 2011, the global top ten polysilicon makers by capacity were GCL, Hemlock, OCI, Wacker, LDK, REC, MEMC/SunEdison, Tokuyama, LCY and Woongjin, represented by People's Republic of China, United States, Taiwan, Germany, Japan and South Korea.

=== Historical rankings ===
In 2015, GCL System Integration Technology Company made an increase of 500%, topping 2.5-2.7 GW, which puts it at seventh rank, overtaking Yingli Green, compared to 0.5 GW in 2014. Their solar PV module production appears to have reached a 3.7 GW capacity at the end of 2015.

Solar modules, as the final products to be installed to generate electricity, are regarded as the major components to be selected by customers willing to choose solar PV energy. Solar module manufacturers must be sure that their products can be sustainable for application periods of more than 25 years. As a result, major solar module producers have their products tested by publicly recognized testing organizations and guarantee their durable efficiency rate for a certain number of years. The solar PV market has been growing for the past few years. According to solar PV research company PVinsights, worldwide shipments of solar modules in 2011 was around 25 GW, and the shipment year-over-year growth was around 40%. The top five solar module producers in 2011 were: Suntech, First Solar, Yingli, Trina, and Canadian. The top five solar module companies possessed 51.3% market share of solar modules, according to PVinsights' market intelligence report.

Ranking 2011	Market share	Solar module company	Ranking 2010	Market share	Country
1	5.8%	Suntech	1	8.1%	China
2	5.7%	First Solar	2	7.9%	(United States) US
3	4.8%	Yingli Solar	4	6.4%	China
4	4.3%	Trina Solar	5	6.1%	China
5	4.0%	Sungen Solar	6	5.3%	China
6	2.8%	Sharp	3		Japan
7	2.8%	Sunpower	8		(United States) US
8	2.7%	Hanwha Solarone	7		South Korea
9	2.3%	Jinko	–		China
10	1.9%	REC	10		Norway

Top 10 solar cell producers

According to an annual market survey by the photovoltaics trade publication Photon International, global production of photovoltaic cells and modules in 2009 was 12.3 GW. The top ten manufacturers accounted for 45% of this total.

In 2010, a tremendous growth of solar PV cell shipments doubled the solar PV cell market size. According to PVinsights, Suntech topped the ranking of solar cell production. Most of the top ten solar PV producers doubled their shipment in 2010 and five of them were over one gigawatt shipments. The top ten solar cell producers dominated the market with an even higher market share, say 50~60%, with respect to an assumed twenty gigawatt cell shipments in 2010.

Solar cell company	Country	Shipment 2009 in MW	Shipment 2010 in MW
Suntech	China	704	1,572
JA Solar	China	520	1,464
First Solar	(United States) US	1,100	1,411
Yingli Solar	China	525	1,062
Trina Solar	China	399	1,057
Motech Solar	Taiwan	360	924
Q-Cells	Germany	586	907
Gintech	Taiwan	368	827
Sharp	Japan	595	774
Sungen Solar	China	193	588
Sources: PhotonMagazine and PVinsights. Note: 2009 shipments of Motech and Canadian Solar are by PVinsights.

Quarterly ranking

Although yearly ranking is as listed above, quarterly ranking can indicate which company can sustain particular conditions such as price adjustment, government feed-in tariff change, and weather conditions. In 2Q11, First Solar regained the top spot in solar module shipments from Suntech. From the 2Q11 results, four phenomena should be noticed: thin film leader First Solar still dominates; more centralization in the solar module market; Chinese companies soared; and the giga-watt game is prevailing (according to the latest solar model shipment report by PVinsigts).

Thin film ranking

Global PV market by technology in 2013
1. multi-Si (54.9%)
2. mono-Si (36.0%)
3. CdTe (5.10%)
4. a-Si (2.00%)
5. CIGS (2.00%)

Thin film solar cells are commercially used in several technologies, including cadmium telluride (CdTe), copper indium gallium diselenide (CIGS), and amorphous and other thin-film silicon (a-Si, TF-Si). In 2013, thin-film declined to 9% of worldwide PV production.

In 2009, thin films represented 16.8% of total global production, up from 12.5% in 2008. The top ten thin-film producers were:

- 1100.0 MW First Solar
- 123.4 MW Suntech solar
- 94.0 MW Sharp
- 60.0 MW HELIOSPHERA
- 50.0 MW Sungen Solar
- 50.0 MW Trony
- 50.0 MW Moser Baer
- 43.0 MW Solar Frontier
- 42.0 MW Mitsubishi
- 40.0 MW Kaneka Corporation
- 40.0 MW Vtech Solar
- 30.0 MW Würth Solar
- 30.0 MW Bosch (formerly Ersol)
- 30.0 MW EPV

^{1} Estimated

=== 2011 global top 10 polysilicon manufacturers by capacity ===
Company	Capacity (tons)	Country
GCL	65,000	China
OCI	65,000	Korea
HSC	43,000	US
Wacker	33,000	Germany
LDK	25,000	China
REC	19,000	Norway
MEMC/SunEdison	15,000	US
Tokuyama	9,200	Japan
LCY	8,000	Taiwan
Woongjin	5,000	Korea
Sourced from EnergyTrend

On the other hand, the 2011 global top ten solar cell makers by capacity are dominated by both Chinese and Taiwanese companies, including Suntech, JA Solar, Trina, Yingli, Motech, Gintech, Canadian Solar, NeoSolarPower, Hanwha Solar One and JinkoSolar.

=== 2011 global top 10 solar cell manufacturers by capacity ===
Company	Capacity (MW)	Country
Suntech	2,400	China
JA Solar	2,100	China
Trina Solar	1,900	China
Yingli	1,700	China
Motech Solar	1,500	Taiwan
Gintech	1,500	Taiwan
Canadian Solar	1,300	Canada
Neo Solar Power	1,300	Taiwan
Hanwha Solar One	1,100	Korea
JinkoSolar	1,100	China
Sourced from EnergyTrend

In terms of solar module by capacity, the 2011 global top ten are Suntech, LDK, Canadian Solar, Trina, Yingli, Hanwha Solar One, Solar World, Jinko Solar, Sunneeg and Sunpower, represented by makers in People's Republic of China and Germany.

=== 2011 global top 10 solar module manufacturers by capacity ===
Company	Capacity (MW)	Country
Suntech	2,400	China
LDK	2,300	China
Canadian Solar	2,000	Canada
Trina Solar	1,900	China
Yingli	1,700	China
Hanwha Solarone	1,500	Korea
SolarWorld	1,400	Germany
Jinko	1,100	China
SUNGEN	1,000	China
Sunpower	1,000	US
Sourced from EnergyTrend

In terms of wafer and cell capacities, both makers from Taiwan and China have demonstrated significant year over year growth from 2010 to 2011.

=== China and Taiwan production capacity ===
	China (MV)	Taiwan (MV)
2010 wafer capacity	15,300	2,640
2011 wafer capacity	26,000	5,020
year over year growth	70%	90%
2010 cell capacity	11,200	5,415
2011 cell capacity	24,000	10,045
year over year growth	114%	86%
Sourced from EnergyTrend

== Solar photovoltaic production by country ==
China now manufactures more than half of the world's solar photovoltaics. Its production has been rapidly escalating. In 2001 it had less than 1% of the world market. In contrast, in 2001 Japan and the United States combined had over 70% of world production. By 2011 they produced around 15%.

== Other companies ==
Other notable companies include:

- Anwell Solar, Hong Kong, China
- Ascent Solar, Tucson, Arizona, US
- Cool Earth Solar, California, US
- Dyesol, Canberra, Australia
- Eurosolar, Germany
- Global Solar, Tucson, Arizona, US
- GreenSun Energy, Jerusalem, Israel
- Hanwha, Seoul, South Korea
- HelioVolt, Austin, Texas, US
- Hitachi, Japan
- IBC SOLAR, Germany
- International Solar Electric Technology, Chatsworth, California, US
- Isofotón, Malaga, Spain
- Konarka Technologies, Inc., Lowell, Massachusetts, US
- LDK Solar, Xinyu, China
- Meyer Burger, Thun, Switzerland
- Miasolé, California, US
- Mitsubishi Electric, Tokyo, Japan
- Nanosolar, San Jose, California, US
- Odersun, Frankfurt Oder, Germany
- Panasonic Corporation Osaka, Japan
- PowerFilm, Inc., Ames, Iowa, US
- Renewable Energy Corporation, Norway
- Schott Solar, Germany
- Signet Solar, California, US
- Skyline Solar, Mountain View, California, US
- SolarEdge, Grass Valley, California, US
- SolarPark Korea, Wanju, South Korea
- SolarWorld, Bonn, Germany
- Solimpeks, Munich, Germany
- SoloPower, San Jose, California, US
- Spectrolab, Inc., Sylmar, California, US
- Sulfurcell, company has changed name to Soltecture in 2011, Germany
- SunEdison
- Suniva, Norcross, Georgia, US
- SunPower Corporation, San Jose, California, US
- Targray Technology International, Kirkland, Quebec, Canada
- Tenksolar, Minneapolis, Minnesota, US
- Topray Solar, China
- Toshiba, Tokyo, Japan
- Unirac, Albuquerque, New Mexico, US
- Wagner & Co., Germany
- Wirsol, Waghäusel, Germany
- Xinyi Solar, Wuhu, China

== List of solar panel factories ==
Below is a list of solar panel factories. It lists actual factories only; former plants are below this first table.

Company	Factory name	Factory location	Plant cost (in US$ millions)	Started production	Panel technology (silicon, thin film, CIGS, etc.)	Capacity/year (in GW)
Sharp Corporation	Sakai	Japan, Sakai				1
Sharp Corporation	Katsuragi	Japan		1981		
Sharp Corporation	Kameyama	Japan, Kameyama				
Sharp Corporation	Taki	Japan				
LG		South Korea, Gumi				
Solar Frontier	Miyazaki	Japan		2009		0.060
Solar Frontier	Kunitomi	Japan	1	2011	CIS	0.9
Solar Frontier	Tohoku	Japan	0.1	2015	CIS	0.150
Neo Solar Power	Fab 3					
Panasonic		Japan				
AU Optronics						

== Closed solar panel factories ==
Company	Factory name	Factory location	Plant cost (in US$ millions)	Started production	Panel technology	Capacity/year (in GW)	Stopped production
Sharp Corporation		UK					
TSMC Solar		Taiwan, Taichung, Central Taiwan Science Park (next to TSMC Fab 15)			CIGS	0.040	2015

== See also ==
- List of CIGS companies
- List of concentrating solar thermal power companies
- List of energy storage projects
- List of silicon producers
- Lists of companies
- Renewable energy industry
  - Silicon Module Super League
- Solar cell
  - Dye-sensitized solar cell
- Solar cell research
- Solar inverter
- Power optimizer
- Applied Materials, a solar cell capital equipment producer
