= Tigo Energy =

American photovoltaic company

Tigo Energy, Inc.
- Type: Private
- Industry: Photovoltaics
- Founded: Silicon Valley, California (2007)
- Founder: Sam Arditi; Ron Hadar
- Headquarters: Campbell, California, United States
- Area served: Worldwide
- Key people: Zvi Alon (CEO)
- Products: Power optimizer Software as a Service
- Number of employees: 138 (May 2026)
- Website: TigoEnergy.com

Tigo Energy is an American private corporation, headquartered in Los Gatos, California, United States. It provides products, technologies, software, and services to installers, distributors, and original equipment manufacturers within the photovoltaic industry. It specializes in module-level power optimizers and smart module power electronics.

The company was founded in 2007 by a team of experienced technologists. The Tigo team developed the first-generation Smart Module Optimizer technology for the solar industry. Tigo has operations in the United States, across Europe, Latin America, Japan, China, Australia and the Middle East.

Tigo Energy is not affiliated with Millicom International Cellular, also known as Tigo.

== History ==
Tigo Energy was founded by Sam Arditi and Ron Hadar in 2007. As of May 2017, the company employs more than 70 people in more than 10 offices worldwide.

In December 2011, the company announced its fourth round of funding, an $18 million investment led by Bessemer Ventures.

In June 2012, Tigo Energy announced an award from the United States Department of Energy as part of its SunShot incubator projects worth $3.5 million. The projects are designed to reduce the ongoing costs and prevent safety hazards from electric arcs in photovoltaic arrays.

In 2012, Tigo Energy announced the market launch of its newest generation of technology designed to be built directly into solar panels during manufacturing. These smart modules included all the benefits of traditional power optimizers, but without requiring installers to add extra boxes to solar modules. Tigo Energy's launch partners included Trina Solar, Hanwha SolarOne, DelSolar, Astronergy, Upsolar, and Luxor Solar.

In September 2012, IMS Research identified Tigo Energy as one of three suppliers accounting for 90% of the micro-inverter and power optimizer market.

In October 2020, Tigo Energy launched the Tigo Enhanced initiative with partner inverters. Tigo incentivizes its program partners to promote Tigo Enhanced inverters by allocating marketing funds for every inverter sold under the program. In addition, the Tigo Enhanced logo, displayed on Tigo module-level power electronics (MLPE) and inverter partner products, creates a visual link of compatibility between devices. Sungrow, Growatt, Chint Power Systems North America, Yaskawa Solectria Solar, and Canadian Solar participate in the program.

January 2021, Tigo Energy raised $20 million in funding led by Energy Growth Momentum.

In August 2021, Tigo Energy announced the release of its Tigo TS4-A-S rapid shutdown with module-level monitoring for solar modules rated up to 700 watts.

In September 2021, Tigo announced a residential inverter and battery storage solution under the Tigo EI (Energy Intelligence) brand.

== Science and technology ==
Tigo Energy uses impedance matching to provide power control, data monitoring and safety mechanisms for every module in a solar array to increase performance and safety over traditional system-level technologies. The company also hosts customer data and provides detailed analytics with a software as a service business model.

The company was the first power optimizer to successfully certify embedding its electronics directly into the junction box of a solar module, reducing the component and labor costs of optimized photovoltaic arrays and eliminating the need for additional hardware.

== Products ==
Tigo TS4 Flex MLPE provide different functions for solar modules including optimization, monitoring, and rapid shutdown.

Tigo EI Residential Solution includes an inverter, battery, and automatic transfer switch (ATS).

Energy Intelligence Software is the Tigo commissioning and monitoring platform.
