= LONGi =

Chinese solar company

LONGi Green Energy Technology
- Native name: 隆基绿能科技股份有限公司 (Chinese)
- Formerly: Xi'an LONGi Silicon Materials Corporation
- Traded as: CSI A50
- ISIN: CNE100001FR6
- Industry: Photovoltaics
- Founded: 14 February 2000
- Founder: Li Zhenguo
- Headquarters: Xi'an, Shaanxi, China
- Key people: Baoshen Zhong, (Chairman); Li Wenxue (Vice-President); Li Zhenguo (President)

Chinese name
- Simplified Chinese: 隆基绿能科技股份有限公司
- Traditional Chinese: 隆基綠能科技股份有限公司
Transcriptions
Standard Mandarin
- Hanyu Pinyin: Lóngjī Lǜnéng Kējì Gǔfèn Yǒuxiàn Gōngsī
- Website: www.longi.com

LONGi Green Energy Technology Co. Ltd. (Chinese: 隆基绿能科技股份有限公司) or LONGi Group (隆基股份), formerly Xi'an Longi Silicon Materials Corporation, is a Chinese photovoltaics company, a major manufacturer of solar modules and a developer of solar power projects.

LONGi is the world's largest manufacturer of monocrystalline silicon wafers and is listed on the Shanghai Stock Exchange.

== History ==
The company was founded 14 February 2000 by Li Zhenguo as Xi'an LONGi Silicon Materials Corporation, with its corporate headquarters in Xi'an, Shaanxi. It changed its name in February 2017 to LONGi Green Energy Technology Co Ltd. to better reflect its wider manufacturing scope after its acquisition of LERRI Solar, and also dropped the "Xi'an" location as part of the name.

In early 2016, LONGi signed a $1.84 billion solar panel sales agreement with SunEdison Products Singapore and agreed to purchase silicon manufactured in South Korea. LONGi also took over SunEdison's Malaysian silicon plant.

In early 2018, LONGi announced plans to build a new 5 GW module assembly plant in the Chuzhou Economic and Technological Development Zone in China's Anhui province, pending an internal review process, then an investment of approximately RMB 1.95 billion (US$300 million) and approximately 28 months of construction and start-up for manufacturing operations to commence.

In 2023, the U.S. Department of Commerce ruled that Vina Solar, a subsidiary of LONGi was circumventing tariffs for Chinese made products.

In 2024, LONGi announced plans to reduce workforce overcapacity by 30% staff reductions. In April 2024, the European Commission initiated an investigation into LONGi over anti-competitive subsidies.

=== Subsidiaries and acquisitions ===
- LERRI Solar Technology Co., Ltd. (a.k.a. LERRI Photovoltaic Technology, also LERRI Solar) was acquired by LONGi in 2014.
- LONGi Solar

== Operations ==
LONGI Silicon Materials is engaged in the research, manufacture and distribution of monocrystalline ingots. It is the world's largest monocrystalline silicon manufacturer, and has rapidly broken world solar efficiency records three times within five months. Fast Company listed Xi'an LONGi Silicon Materials one among "Most Innovative Companies 2013" "for supplying the solar industry with high-quality silicon wafers at low cost".

=== Business ===
LONGi has been called the fastest growing PV manufacturer in the industry. LONGi annual revenue in 2013 was derived entirely from selling around US$330 million of mono c-Si wafers, but by 2016 that annual revenue had skyrocketed to approximately US$1.67 billion. That was a nearly 94% increase over the 2015 fiscal year, which had itself generated a revenue growth of around 61% over the year before.

LONGi has manufacturing plants in Mainland China, India and Malaysia, and has acquired production facilities from other companies, including from American manufacturer SunEdison. However, Photon.Info reports that Longi Green Energy is mulling an open manufactory in the USA.

Longi Silicon is a member of the Silicon Module Super League (SMSL), which had been a group of big-six c-Si module suppliers in the solar PV industry today until Longi was admitted. The other six members of the SMSL group are Canadian Solar, Hanwha Q CELLS, JA Solar, Jinko Solar, Trina Solar, and GCL.

Longi Silicon has been listed on the Shanghai Stock Exchange (security code: 601012) since April 2012.

=== Research and development ===
LONGi Solar, a subsidiary of LONGI Green Energy Technology, achieved in 2018 a new industry record with 23.6% conversion efficiency with its P-type monocrystalline PERC (passivated emitter rear cell) solar cells, toward which an increasing number of manufacturers worldwide are migrating. The technique involves taking a silicon wafer, typically 1 to 2 mm thick, and making a multitude of parallel, transverse slices across the wafer, creating a large number of slivers that have a thickness of 50 micrometres and a width equal to the thickness of the original wafer. These slices are rotated 90 degrees, so that the surfaces corresponding to the faces of the original wafer become the edges of the slivers. The result is to convert, for example, a 150 mm diameter, 2 mm-thick wafer having an exposed silicon surface area of about 175 cm^{2} per side into about 1000 slivers having dimensions of 100 mm × 2 mm × 0.1 mm, yielding a total exposed silicon surface area of about 2000 cm^{2} per side. The electrical doping and contacts that had been on the face of the wafer are now located at the edges of the sliver, rather than at the front and rear as in the case of conventional wafer cells, as a result of this rotation. This results in making the cell sensitive on both sides, from both the front and rear of the cell (a property known as bifaciality).

As of April 2026, LONGi appears 9 times on the data table for the National Laboratory of the Rockies Best Research-Cell Efficiency Chart (cell-efficiency-data-table.xlsx), specifically in the silicon heterostructure and perovskite/Si categories.

== Products ==
- P/N-type Mono-crystalline silicon wafer
- P/N-type Mono-crystalline ingots
- Bifacial solar cells
