= Photovoltaik Global 30 Index =

- Foundation: 1 June 2009
- Operator: Deutsche Börse
- Exchanges: Frankfurt Stock Exchange
- Constituents: 15 (2013)
- Type: Renewable energy
- Weighting method: Capitalization-weighted
- Related indices: DAX, MDAX, SDAX, TecDAX
- Website: Photovoltaik Global Index, actual track

Countries represented in 2010

Photovoltaik Global 30 Index is a German stock market index which includes up to 30 companies in the photovoltaics sector. It was introduced on 1 June 2009. The constituting companies and their weightings are reviewed quarterly (March, June, September and December). No company should be represented with more than 10 per cent. The Photovoltaik Global 30 Index is calculated as a performance index as well as a price index.

The index is a top list of international companies with more than 50 percent turnover in solar energy and an average daily stock exchange turnover of more than 1 million US dollar.

== Development ==
The Photovoltaik Global 30 Index is based on Xetra and Reuters. Its composition and weightings (price index) is shown below:

Name	Country	8 March 2013	Remarks
First Solar	United States	15.72 %	
MEMC	United States	12.09 %	
SunPower	United States	10.76 %	
SMA Solar Technology	Germany	8.55 %	
Renewable Energy Corporation	Norway	6.50 %	
Motech Industries	Taiwan	6.43 %	
Trina Solar	China	5.89 %	
Meyer Burger	Switzerland	5.83 %	
GT Solar International	United States	5.45 %	
Gintech Energy	Taiwan	4.89 %	
Green Energy Technology	Taiwan	4.38 %	
Neo Solar Power	Taiwan	4.28 %	
E-Ton Solar Tech	Taiwan	3.25 %	
Solartech Energy	Taiwan	3.34 %	
SolarWorld	Germany	2.62 %	

== See also ==
- DAX
- MDAX
- ÖkoDAX
- SDAX
- TecDAX
