= Photovoltaics manufacturing in Malaysia =

Industry in Malaysia

In 2022, Malaysia was the world's third largest manufacturer of photovoltaics, also known as PV modules, contributing 2.8% to the global output. This ranking placed Malaysia behind both China, which dominated the market with a significant 77.8% share, and Vietnam, which accounted for 6.4% of the world's photovoltaic production.

In 2014, Malaysia was the world's third largest manufacturer of PV modules behind China and the European Union.

== Global industry ==
In 2022, Malaysia's role in the global photovoltaic (PV) market was marked by significant export figures. Data from the Malaysia External Trade Development Corporation (Matrade) indicate that the nation's exports of PV products totaled RM41.6 billion, representing a 22% increase from the previous year. This indicates an expansion in Malaysia's participation in the global renewable energy sector. In the same year, the major export destinations for Malaysia's PV products included the United States, which received 22.9% of the exports. Other key markets were Singapore and Hong Kong, each with 13.1%, followed by China at 11%, Germany at 9.9%, and Vietnam at 7.3%.

In addition, Malaysia made a significant contribution to the global supply of polysilicon, a key material for solar cells. In 2021, the country produced 50,000 tonnes of polysilicon, accounting for 6.7% of the worldwide supply, according to the International Energy Agency (IEA).

== Major manufacturing facilities ==
Malaysia is a major hub for solar equipment manufacturing, with factories of companies like First Solar, Panasonic, TS Solartech, Jinko Solar, JA Solar, SunPower, Q-Cells, and SunEdison in locations like Kulim, Penang, Malacca, Cyberjaya, and Ipoh.

Many international companies have the majority of production capacity located in Malaysia, such as the American company First Solar which has over 2000 MW of production capacity located in Kulim and only 280 MW located in Ohio, and German-based Q-Cells which produces 1,100 MW worth of solar cells in Cyberjaya while producing only 200 MW worth of solar cells in Germany. SunPower's largest manufacturing facility with a capacity of 1400 MW is also located in Malacca.

=== Malaysian companies ===
- TS Solartech
  - Location: Penang Science Park
    - Capacity: 500 MW (solar cells)
    - Production lines: 7

=== Foreign companies ===
- First Solar
  - Location: Kulim Hi-Tech Park
    - Capacity: 2000 MW (solar cells), 100 MW (solar modules)
    - Production lines: 24
- JA Solar
  - Location: Penang
    - Capacity: 400 MW (solar cells)
- Jinko Solar
  - Location: Penang
    - Capacity: 500 MW (solar cells), 450 MW (solar modules)
    - Production lines: 7
- Panasonic Energy Malaysia
  - Location: Kulim Hi-Tech Park
    - Capacity: 300 MW
- Q-Cells Malaysia
  - Location: Cyberjaya
    - Capacity: 1,100 MW (solar cells), 800 MW (solar modules)
    - Production lines: 4 (solar modules)
- SunEdison
  - Location: Ipoh (solar wafer)
- SunPower
  - Location: Malacca
    - Capacity: 1,400 MW (solar cells)
    - Production lines: 28
- LONGi Solar
  - Location: Kuching, Sarawak
    - Capacity: 600 MW (solar cells), 600 MW (solar modules)
