= Silicon Module Super League =

Largest suppliers of crystalline silicon modules used in solar power

- Abbreviation: SMSL
- Type: Group

The Silicon Module Super League (SMSL) later the Solar Module Super League is a group of major crystalline silicon (c-Si) module suppliers in the solar PV industry. The 'big six' industry group members were Canadian Solar, Hanwha Q CELLS, JA Solar, Jinko Solar, and Trina Solar. LONGi the world's largest solar monocrystalline silicon manufacturer and GCL, the world's largest solar poly crystalline silicon manufacturer, both joined the SMSL in mid-2016. As of February 2019, PVTech added First Solar and Risen Energy to the list of SMSL manufacturers.

The achievement scale of this solar module industry breakaway group is notable. These seven module suppliers have been forecast to ship about half of the world's end-market supply during 2017.

Chinese solar engineers at Trina Solar held the record for a 22.61% PV efficiency in mono-PERC-cells in 2016, with Passivated Emitter and Rear Cell (PERC) technology developed at its State Key Laboratory of PV Science and Technology of China. That one-third efficiency improvement was achieved through four years of PV research in China.

SMSL group members have held the PV efficiency record for some time. Trina Solar in 2015 had set the previous record of 22.13%. Again, in July 2016, Trina Solar claimed that its production lines were able to produce the same kind of PERC cells in large volume with an average efficiency of 21.12%. This new, later higher cell efficiency which surpasses Trina Solar's record, has been independently confirmed by the Fraunhofer ISE CalLab in Germany. Trina Solar achieved 24.13% conversion efficiency for IBC solar cell.

== See also ==
- Materials science
- Solar energy in China
- Solar energy in Germany
- List of photovoltaics companies
