= Evergreen Solar =

Evergreen Solar, Inc.
- Type: Public
- Traded as: OTC Pink: ESLRQ; Nasdaq: ESLR
- Industry: Renewable Energy
- Founded: 1994; 32 years ago
- Headquarters: Marlborough, Massachusetts; United States
- Products: Solar Cells
- Revenue: ▲US$112 Million (FY 2008)
- Operating income: ▼US$-75.0 Million (FY 2008)
- Net income: ▼US$-84.9 Million (FY 2008)
- Total assets: ▲US$1.00 Billion (FY 2008)
- Total equity: ▲US$520 Million (FY 2008)
- Website: www.evergreensolar.com

Evergreen Solar, Inc. was "a fully integrated manufacturer of solar panels producing wafers, cells and panels." On August 15, 2011, the company filed for Chapter 11 reorganization with the intent of selling its assets.

Evergreen Solar was founded in 1994 and until bankruptcy traded on the NASDAQ exchange. Evergreen produced proprietary "String Ribbon" solar cells for the photovoltaics industry. The company announced plans to close its main American factory and lay off the 800 workers there by March 2011. Evergreen is shifting production to China where it has a joint venture. The company received $21 million from Massachusetts, covering part of the cost of the Devens factory.

== Company ==
Evergreen operated out of Marlborough, Massachusetts, USA and in 2007 announced plans to expand annual production from 17MW to 100MW.

In 2006 Evergreen, Q-Cells and Renewable Energy Corporation (REC) formed EverQ (later renamed Sovello), a joint venture to open a factory in Thalheim, Germany which was expected to produce 300 MW of photovoltaic modules by 2010. Sovello intended to make a public stock offering, but instead was acquired by Ventizz Capital Partners.

Evergreen's factory in Devens, MA opened in mid-2008 and expected to be producing at a rate of 80 megawatts per year by early 2009. A second phase was scheduled to begin ramping in early 2009 to produce an additional 80 megawatts per year. CEO Richard Feldt had said the company was eyeing expansion in Asia as well.

CEO Michael El-Hillow (appointed September 2010) closed the factory at Devens, MA at the end of March, 2011, shifting production to China.

== See also ==
- Green technology
- List of photovoltaics companies
- Photovoltaic array
- Photovoltaics
- Renewable energy
- Renewable Energy Corporation
- Solar power
- Solar shingle
- Solar tracker
- String Ribbon
