= Yingli =

Chinese solar energy company

Yingli Green Energy Holding Company Limited
- Native name: 英利
- Company type: Public (OTC Pink: YGEHY)
- Industry: solar energy
- Founded: 1998
- Headquarters: Baoding, Hebei province, People's Republic of China
- Key people: Liansheng Miao (Chairman and CEO)
- Products: photovoltaic products
- Number of employees: 14,533 (Dec 31st 2015)
- Website: www.yinglisolar.com

Yingli (Chinese: 英利), formally Yingli Green Energy Holding Company Limited (Chinese: 英利绿色能源控股有限公司; pinyin: Yīnglì Lǜsè Néngyuán Kònggǔ Yǒuxiàn Gōngsī), and also known as "Yingli Solar," is a solar panel manufacturer. Yingli Green Energy's manufacturing covers the photovoltaic value chain from ingot casting and wafering through solar cell production and solar panel assembly.

Yingli expanded production capacity at a time module prices slumped. Yingli recovered slowly and since early 2015 has faced financial difficulties and has been going through a debt restructuring out of court. In 2015 signed a contract with LONGi to cooperate on monocrystalline products. In the first quarter of 2016 Yingli posted a profit first time since 2011. Yingli has cut workforce and decreased R&D spending. Yingli's cost per watt is 41 cents. The company was a sponsor of the 2014 FIFA World Cup, U.S. men's and women's national soccer teams, and FC Bayern Munich.

Yingli is a member of the ‘Silicon Module Super League’ (SMSL), a group of big-six c-Si module suppliers in the solar PV industry today. The other five members of the group are Canadian Solar, Hanwha Q CELLS, JA Solar, Trina Solar and Jinko Solar.

== History ==
In 2009, the company acquired Cyber Power, a development stage enterprise with plans to begin production of solar-grade polysilicon. Yingli Solar is expected to start trial polysilicon by the end of 2010. Growing at a fast rate, 2010 first quarter reports indicated that it was Yingli Solar's most profitable quarter to date.

In 2010, Yingli Green Energy became the first Chinese company and the first renewable energy company to sponsor the FIFA World Cup. Yingli was also a sponsor of the 2014 FIFA World Cup in Brazil. It supplied modules to 2014 FIFA World Cup stadiums, including the Maracanã Stadium in Rio de Janeiro.

Building on its partnership with FIFA, Yingli is also a sponsor of FC Bayern München and the U.S. Soccer Women's and Men's National Teams.

== Products ==
In 2012, Yingli Green Energy reached a production capacity of 2,450 MW per year, making it the largest solar module manufacturer in the world in terms of module production capacity. It also became the world's leading solar module supplier by sales revenue and shipments in Q1 2012. Also in 2012, Ray Lian predicted that Yingli Green Energy was likely to become the world's largest supplier in terms of full-year module shipments in 2012.

Yingli manufactures crystalline silicon solar PV modules, including both, monocrystalline and multicrystalline. Its two primary solar module product lines are the monocrystalline PANDA Series and the multicrystalline YGE Series.

Yingli Solar's YGE Series is its primary product line. The company claims that these multicrystalline modules have efficiencies of up to 15.4%, for use in commercial, residential, and utility-scale projects.

Yingli Solar's manufacturing facilities are located in Baoding, Haikou, Tianjin, and Hengshui. Yingli Americas, a regional subsidiary of Yingli Green Energy, operates a regional research and development lab, the PV Testing Lab (PVTL), in South San Francisco, California. The PVTL conducts product characterization and quality control testing, and provides customers with system modeling support.

== See also ==
- Solar power in China
