= Huaneng Geermu Solar Park =

Photovoltaic power station in Qinghai, China

- Country: China
- Location: Geermu City, Qinghai Province
- Coordinates: 36°23′N 95°06′E
- Status: Operational
- Commission date: 2012

Solar farm
- Type: Flat-panel PV

Power generation
- Units operational: 245,900
- Nameplate capacity: 50 MW

The Huaneng Geermu Solar Park is a 50 MWp photovoltaic power station located in the Qinghai Province of China. Most of it uses fixed tilt arrays, but has a 0.25 MW and a 5 MW single axis tracking section. Phase I is 5 MW, Phase II of the first section is 15 MW. 2 MW are amorphous silicon GS-50 modules from GS Solar rated 50 Watts each. The remaining 18 MW is polycrystalline silicon TW230(28)B modules from Tianwei New Energy PV Module rated 230 Watts each. A second section, called the Huaneng Geermu Phase II Solar Power Generation Project, 30 MWp, includes a 5 MW tracking section. The remaining 25 MW is fixed tilt. 15 MW uses TW235P60-FA2 modules from Tianwei New Energy PV Module, 10 MW uses YL235PT-29b modules from Yingli, and 5 MW uses TSM-235PC05 modules from Trina Solar. All of the modules are rated 235 Watts.

== See also ==
- List of photovoltaic power stations
- Photovoltaic power station
- Photovoltaics
