= List of silicon producers =

This is a list of silicon producers. The industry involves several very different stages of production. Production starts at silicon metal, which is the material used to gain high purity silicon. High purity silicon in different grades of purity is used for growing silicon ingots, which are sliced to wafers in a process called wafering. Compositionally pure polycrystalline silicon wafers are useful for photovoltaics. Dislocation-free and extremely flat single-crystal silicon wafers are required in the manufacture of computer chips.

== Polysilicon producers ==
Polysilicon producers:

- Elkem
- JFE Steel
- Nitol Solar (Russia), bankrupt since 2019
- SunEdison

== High-purity silicon ==
Producers of high-purity silicon, an intermediate in the manufacture of polysilicon

- Hemlock Semiconductor Corporation
- Renewable Energy Corporation (REC)
- Tokuyama Corporation
- Wacker Chemie AG

== Silicon wafer manufacturers ==
A partial list of major producers of wafers (made of high purity silicon, mono- or polycrystalline) includes:

- GlobalWafers
- Okmetic
- Renewable Energy Corporation
- Shin-Etsu Handotai
- Siltronic
- SUMCO

== See also ==
- List of photovoltaics companies
