= Rothenburg Solar Park =

Photovoltaic power station in Rothenburg, Oberlausitz in Germany

- Country: Germany
- Location: Rothenburg, Oberlausitz
- Coordinates: 51°21′30″N 14°57′10″E
- Status: Operational
- Commission date: December 2009

Solar farm
- Type: Flat-panel PV
- Site area: 100 ha (247 acres)

Power generation
- Units operational: 273,240 First Solar, 32,640 Yingli and 30,720 BYD
- Nameplate capacity: 37 MW

The Rothenburg Solar Park is a photovoltaic power station in Rothenburg, Oberlausitz in Germany. Initially it had a capacity of 20.5 megawatts (MW). The solar park is equipped with 273,240 CdTe-modules from First Solar, and 11 Siemens central inverters. The project was commissioned in 2009. The original solar farm was divided into three fields on the airfield site.

In September 2012, the three existing plants were supplemented by a fourth with a rated capacity of 15.2 MWp. As a result, the solar park now has a total capacity of 37 MWp. Unlike the first three plants, the fourth uses solar modules from Yingli and BYD.

== See also ==
- Photovoltaic power stations
