= Japan Photovoltaic Energy Association =

Japan Photovoltaic Energy Association (JPEA) is a body for solar photovoltaic energy companies in Japan. Founded on April 23, 1987, it has a number of objectives and activities, one of which is providing the JPEC certification for solar modules in the Japanese market. The association serves as a spokesperson for the photovoltaics energy industry in Japan.

JPEA set a pathway for the photovoltaic industry in Japan to reach 100 GW by 2030, from roughly 30 GW in 2015. The group comprises multiple companies in the industry, and reported a 13% drop in total photovoltaic solar panel shipments in 2015.
