= Shirley Airport =

Airport in Massachusetts, US, 1960s–2000s

- IATA: none; ICAO: none

Summary
- Operator: Private
- Location: Shirley, Massachusetts
- Built: 1961-1963
- In use: After 1951-Before 2005
- Occupants: Private
- Elevation AMSL: 385 ft / 117 m
- Coordinates: 42°31′31.75″N 71°39′52.08″W
- Interactive map of Shirley Airport

Shirley Airport was an airfield operational in the mid-20th century in Shirley, Massachusetts. It was established in the early 1960s with a single 1,800 foot north/south runway. The airport closed in the early 2000s. It is now the site for a 6 MW solar farm with nearly 20,000 Canadian Solar modules, supplying electricity to the town of Billerica, Massachusetts.
