= Perleberg Solar Park =

Photovoltaic power station

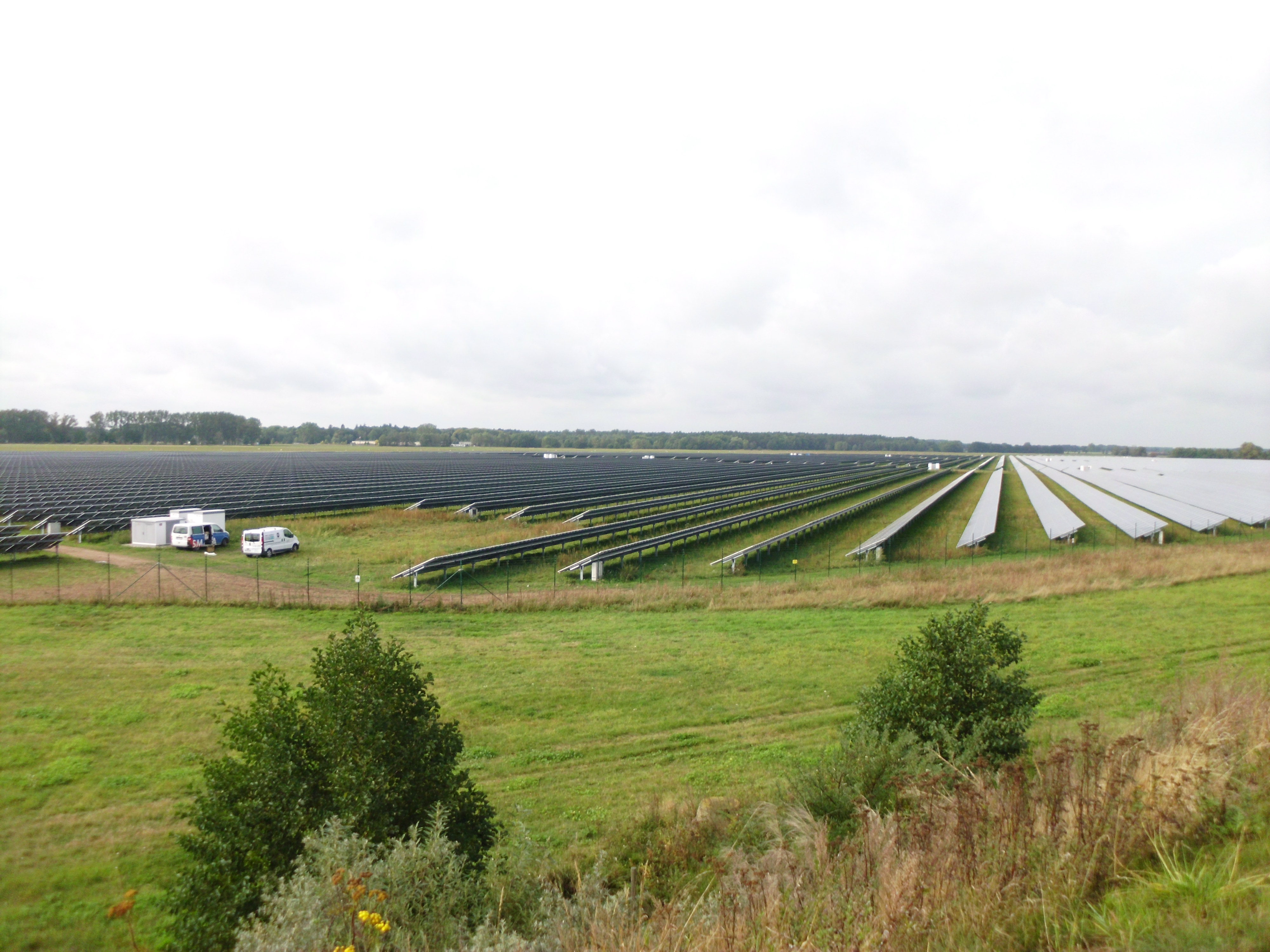
- Country: Germany
- Location: Perleberg
- Coordinates: 53°04′21″N 11°49′30″E
- Status: Operational
- Construction began: April 2012
- Commission date: June 30, 2012
- Owner: Gehrlicher Solar

Solar farm
- Type: Flat-panel PV
- Site area: 64 ha (160 acres)

Power generation
- Units operational: 144,144
- Nameplate capacity: 35 MW_{p}
- Annual net output: 33 GWh

The Perleberg Solar Park is a photovoltaic power station, with an installed capacity of 35 megawatts (MW). It uses 144,144 solar panels manufactured by Chinese company Yingli. The panels are mounted at a fixed angle on posts that are driven into the ground, at a former military airport.

== See also ==
- Photovoltaic power station
- PV system
- List of photovoltaic power stations
- Solar power in Germany
- Electricity sector in Germany
