= Lu Yonghua =

Chinese billionaire businessman

- Born: Qidong, Jiangsu, China
- Occupation: Businessman

Lu Yonghua is a Chinese billionaire businessman. He founded and is CEO of Linyang Electronics, founded in 1995. From 1988 to 1996, he was the general manager of the computing firm Qidong Changtong Computer. He also founded Hanwha SolarOne, originally called Jiangsu Linyang Solarfun.
