= Bosch Solar Energy =

German solar wafer and solar cell manufacturer

Bosch Solar Energy AG
- Company type: Public (FWB: ES6)
- Industry: Renewable Energies, Photovoltaics
- Founded: 1997
- Headquarters: Erfurt, Germany
- Key people: Holger von Hebel (CEO); Juergen Pressl (COO); Peter Schneidewind (CSO); Volker Nadenau (CTO)
- Number of employees: 1517 (as of 1 February 2010)
- Website: www.bosch-solarenergy.de

Bosch Solar Energy AG was a German solar wafer and solar cell manufacturer, based in Erfurt, which specialized in crystalline silicon-based photovoltaic (PV) products, as well as thin-film modules using amorphous silicon and CIGS absorber materials. The company consisted of various divisions for silicon, wafers, solar cells and modules, research and production facilities in Germany and France and plans were made to open a production line in Malaysia. It has been listed on the German stock exchange since 30 September 2005 and on 19 December 2005 its shares were admitted to the TecDAX. The enterprise was founded in 1997 as ErSol Solarstrom GmbH & Co. KG.

In 2013, Robert Bosch GmbH announced that it will exit from the solar business. SolarWorld took over production in Arnstadt and continued to employ about 800 workers. The parent company also sold its shares of Aleo Solar.
