= Motech =

Taiwanese solar cell manufacturer

Motech Industries Inc.
- Company type: Public (OTC:6244)
- Industry: Solar photovoltaics, Optoelectronics
- Founded: 1981
- Headquarters: Tainan, Taiwan
- Key people: Dr. Simon Y.H. Tsuo (Chairman); Dr. P.H. Chang (CEO)
- Products: Silicon solar cells, inverters, modules and solar electricity systems design/installation
- Revenue: US$1.14 billion (2010)
- Number of employees: ~3,500
- Divisions: Motech Solar; Motech Instruments; Motech Power; Motech (Suzhou) Renewable Energy Co. Ltd. (SNE); Motech Americas LLC; Motech Japan
- Website: motech.com.tw（Chinese） motechsolar.com（English） motech-japan.com（Japanese）

Motech Industries Inc. or Motech Solar, is a solar cell manufacturer based in Taiwan, ranked as the 6th largest solar cell manufacturer in the world in 2007.

As part of an expansion effort into the US, Motech purchased the AstroPower plant in Newark but subsequently closed it down in 2014 due to operational costs. Since then, the company has expanded operations to include production of whole panels.

== History ==
Motech Industries Inc. was founded in 1981 as a designer and manufacturer of test and measurement instruments. The company entered into solar cell production in 1999 as a pioneer in the manufacturing and marketing of high-quality single and polycrystalline silicon solar cells in Taiwan. The company is the largest solar cell manufacturer in Taiwan and one of the top ten manufacturers worldwide in terms of production capacity and output.

== See also ==
- Solar energy
- List of photovoltaics companies
