= LDK Solar Co =

Chinese solar panel company

LDK Solar Co., Ltd.
- Industry: Photovoltaics
- Founded: 2005
- Headquarters: Xinyu, Jiangxi, China
- Key people: Xiaofeng Peng (Chairman & CEO)
- Revenue: ▲US$1.643 billion (2008)
- Operating income: ▲US$8.99 million (2008)
- Net income: US$70.223 million (2008)
- Total assets: ▲US$ 3.373 billion (2008)
- Total equity: ▲US$ 775.9 million (2008)
- Website: www.ldksolar.com

LDK Solar Co. Ltd., previously located in Xinyu City, Jiangxi province in the People's Republic of China, manufactured multicrystalline solar wafers used in solar cells, and provided wafering services for both monocrystalline and multicrystalline wafers. Their distribution network for solar products covered over 43 distributors and wholesalers across 15 countries.

LDK filed for Chapter 11 bankruptcy in 2014.

LDK and its Chinese subsidiaries were forced into bankruptcy in 2015.

== History ==
=== Founding ===
Xiaofeng Peng founded LDK Solar in July 2005 and is its chairman and chief executive officer. Mr. Peng first founded Suzhou Liouxin in March 1997, and was its chief executive officer until February 2006. Suzhou Liouxin manufactured personal protective equipment products like gloves and employed 12,000. He considered adding solar cell wafers to its product line when he realized that no Chinese company was producing them. In 2005, Peng invested $30 million of his own money and $80 million of venture financing into building factories.

=== Production ===
LDK stated an annualized solar wafer capacity of 1.46 GW at the end of 2008, and 3GW at the end of 2010.

LDK contracted with Fluor Corp., an American engineering firm, for construction of a 15,000 ton per year polysilicon plant. The first 5000-ton train went into production in July 2009, with the second 5000 train scheduled for Q3 and third and final train by the end of 2010.

A second polysilicon plant was bought by LDK from Sunways AG, and entered production phase at the end of 2008. On January 16, 2009, LDK announced the completion of their first polysilicon production run from their Sunways Plant .

=== Bankruptcy ===
Despite rapid growth fueled by vertical integration—enabling cost reductions through control over each stage—LDK faced financial difficulties amid industry oversupply and price declines. It filed for bankruptcy protection between 2014–2015 but remains recognized for its technological contributions to large-format casting mono wafers (“210mm Casting Mono”) that have won industry awards. LDK and its Chinese subsidiaries were forced into bankruptcy in 2015.
