= Li Zhenguo =

Chinese billionaire businessman

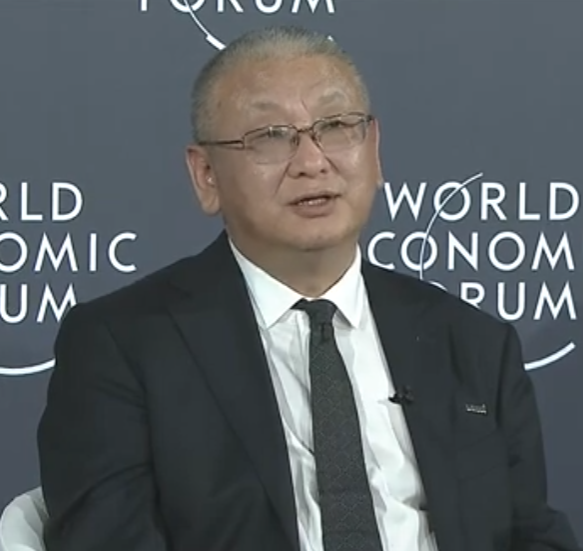
- At a WEF special meeting in 2024
- Born: 5 January 1968 (age 58)
- Education: Lanzhou University, Xi'an Jiaotong University

Li Zhenguo (born 5 January 1968) is a Chinese billionaire and businessman, the founder and the president of LONGi Green Energy Technology, which specializes on photovoltaic solar modules.

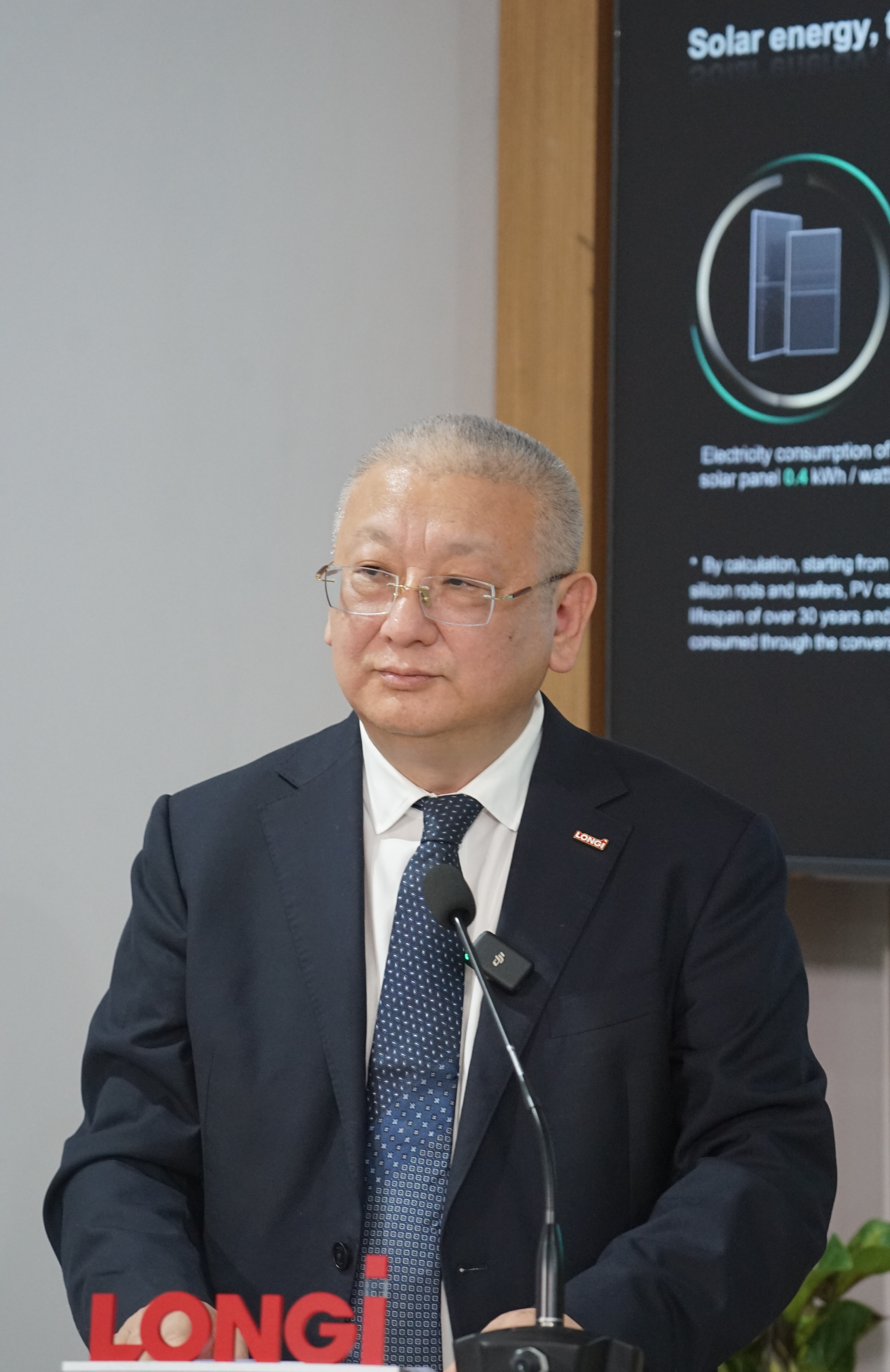
Li at COP30 in Belém (2025)

After graduating from Lanzhou University, Li Zhenguo started working at the Huashan Semiconductor Materials Factory. Afterwards, he served as the operating director of Shanxi Wenxi Xinda Electronic Parts Factory. Later he continued his career as the director of the crystal base of Xi'an University of Technology factory and the general manager of Xi'an Lijing Electronic Technology Co., Ltd. Li Zhenguo found LONGi in 2000 together with his classmates from the Lanzhou University and his wife, Li Yanxi. Initially, the company focused on supplying reprocessed silicon materials and only later the founders decided to focus on solar. As of 2022, the company is the world's biggest monocrystalline silicon solar maker. In 2021, it declared its intentions to manufacture overseas plants, including the ones in India, Saudi Arabia, and the US that would function in addition to the already existing factories in China, Malaysia and Vietnam with more than 60,000 employees.

Li Zhenguo and his family made the 2022 Forbes Billionaires List with an estimated wealth of $12.9 billion and occupied the 142nd position.
