= JinkoSolar =

Chinese solar panel manufacturer

JinkoSolar Holding Co., Ltd.
- Native name: 晶科能源股份有限公司
- Type: Public
- Traded as: NYSE: JKS
- ISIN: US47759T1007
- Industry: Photovoltaics
- Founded: 2006; 20 years ago
- Headquarters: Shanghai
- Key people: Xiande Li (Chairman & CEO)
- Revenue: ¥92.26 billion (US$12.64 billion) (2024)
- Net income: ¥57.5 million (US$7.9 million) (2024)
- Number of employees: 46,511 (2022)
- Website: www.jinkosolar.com

JinkoSolar Holding Co., Ltd. is a solar module manufacturer headquartered in Shanghai, China, and listed on the New York Stock Exchange (NYSE: JKS) since 2010. Its subsidiary Jinko Solar Co., Ltd. (SSE: 688223) was listed on the Shanghai Stock Exchange's Science and Technology Innovation Board in 2022.

== History ==
In December 2006, JinkoSolar was established in December 2006 in Shangrao, Jiangxi, China.

In May 2010, JinkoSolar was listed on the New York Stock Exchange. In 2015, JinkoSolar established manufacturing operations in Malaysia.

Jinko Solar provided the equipment for, and has a 20% ownership stake in, the 2 GW Al Dhafra Solar project in the United Arab Emirates, which was announced in 2020 and opened in 2023 and was one of the world's largest solar projects.

In 2021, the U.S. Customs and Border Protection began blocking the import of JinkoSolar products into the United States due to concerns about the use of forced Uyghur labor. In August 2023, the U.S. Department of Commerce determined that JinkoSolar had not circumvented tariffs on Chinese made goods.

In May 2023, agents from the United States Department of Homeland Security and Federal Bureau of Investigation raided JinkoSolar's offices in Jacksonville, Florida. A survey conducted by US Customs and Border Protection in 2024 indicated taking a strong enforcement approach that will be difficult to answer for small/medium-sized solar companies without stable supply chain. Increased enforcement was noted by Roth Capital Partners to be beneficial for larger manufacturers such as Jinko, who had "mostly cleared the UFLPA gauntlet". As of May 2024, no further action has been taken by federal officials on the matter.

In November 2024, JinkoSolar Holding Co. announced an offering of up to 4.5 billion yuan seeking a listing on the Frankfurt stock exchange.

JinkoSolar is a member of the Silicon Module Super League. The four other original members of the group are Canadian Solar, Hanwha Q CELLS, JA Solar, and Trina Solar.

== Business trends ==
Year	Net Revenue	Net income	Module shipments
2016	¥21.40 billion (US$3.08 billion)	¥1.25 billion (US$179.4 million)	6,656 MW
2017	¥26.47 billion (US$4.07 billion)	¥209.0 million (US$32.1 million)	9,807 MW
2018	¥25.04 billion (US$3.64 billion)	¥435.8 million (US$63.4 million)	11,400 MW
2019	¥29.75 billion (US$4.27 billion)	¥898.7 million (US$129.1 million)	14,300 MW
2020	US$5.38 billion	US$146.9 million	18,771 MW
2021	¥40.83 billion (US$6.41 billion)	¥721.0 million (US$113.1 million)	25,242 MW
2022	¥83.53 billion (US$12.11 billion)	¥665.2 million (US$96.4 million)	46,580 MW
2023	¥118.68 billion (US$16.72 billion)	¥3.45 billion (US$485.6 million)	83,562 MW
2024	¥92.26 billion (US$12.64 billion)	¥57.5 million (US$7.9 million)	99,596 MW

== Manufacturing ==
JinkoSolar produces ingots, wafers, cells, and modules. Solar photovoltaic modules are the company's main product.

In 2015, JinkoSolar entered a partnership with DuPont to incorporate materials into photovoltaic metallization pastes and polyvinyl fluoride films in its solar modules.

JinkoSolar began mass production of n-type TOPCon cells in 2019. Also in 2019, Jinko officially opened the company's first U.S. factory. In 2022, the company established a factory in Vietnam.

== See also ==
- List of renewable energy companies by country
