= SolarWorld =

Manufacturer of photovoltaics

SolarWorld AG
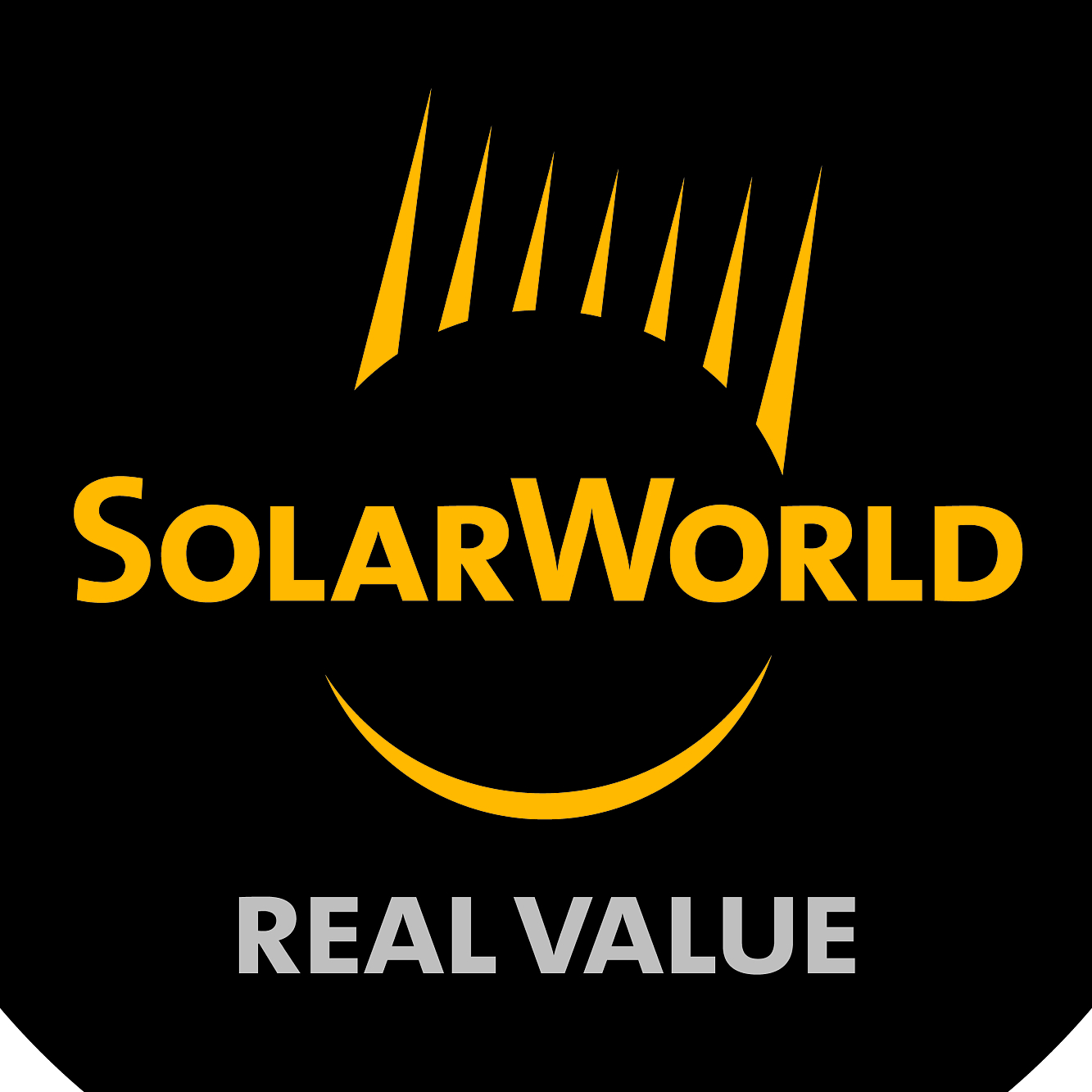
- Type: Aktiengesellschaft
- Traded as: FWB: SWV
- Industry: Photovoltaics
- Founded: 1988
- Headquarters: Bonn, Germany
- Key people: Frank H. Asbeck (founder and CEO), Georg Gansen (Chairman of the supervisory board)
- Products: Solar cells, wafers, PV modules and systems
- Revenue: ▼€803,066 (2016)
- Operating income: ▼€63,400 (2016)
- Net income: €87.3 million (2010)
- Total assets: ▼€686,943 (2016)
- Total equity: ▼€121,808 (2016)
- Number of employees: ▲3,034 (incl. temporary workers) (2016)
- Subsidiaries: SolarWorld Innovations GmbH; SolarWorld Industries Sachsen GmbH

SolarWorld is a German company dedicated to the manufacture and marketing of photovoltaic products worldwide by integrating all components of the solar value chain, from feedstock (polysilicon) to module production, from trade with solar panels to the promotion and construction of turn-key solar power systems. The group controls the development of solar power technologies at all levels in-house.

SolarWorld AG is listed on the Frankfurt Stock Exchange, the Photovoltaik Global 30 Index and the ÖkoDAX.

In May 2017, wholly owned subsidiary SolarWorld Americas, based in Oregon, US, joined fellow American solar panel manufacturer Suniva in its Section 201 trade action to request relief from what it claimed are unfair practices from solar panel importers to the United States. The requested remedy was a tariff on imported solar panels. FirstSolar, the largest US solar panel manufacturer, joined the action on October 10, 2017, while the Solar Energy Industry Association (the major American solar trade association) was leading the opposition to the tariff requests.

The company filed for insolvency of its German subsidiaries alone in May 2017. While subsidiary SolarWorld America was not itself insolvent, it subsequently was put up for sale or other action to help resolve the debts of the German parent company. It was eventually purchased by SunPower Corporation in April 2018. In the beginning of August 2017, leaving all liabilities behind, all the assets alone were acquired by the original Founder of SolarWorld Ag, Frank Asbeck along with Qatar Solar Technologies (QSTec) to form SolarWorld Industries GmbH, thus becoming completely debt-free and the only Solar Manufacturer in the world with zero-debt and zero liability. According to the Press Release issued by SolarWorld Industries GmbH, it will now have just 500 employees, drastically down from earlier, thus cutting costs. According to the company, the company will continue its transition to mono PERC-only cells production. The new entity, SolarWorld Industries GmbH takes over the production facilities and distribution businesses in Europe, Asia and Africa. "We plan to start with a production capacity of 700 MW, which can also be boosted to the previous capacity of more than 1GW. At launch, the company will have 515 employees. Of these, more than 12% are employed in research and more than 5% are trainees,” he said adding that the new company had already signed a 25MW order, without giving further details.

The newly founded SolarWorld Industries GmbH filed for insolvency again in March 2018. In June 2018 the regional public TV station MDR reported, that most of SolarWorlds production workers have been transferred into other forms of employment and production will be closed by end of September.

More than two years after the insolvency, the Solarworld factory in Freiberg gets a new opportunity. The buildings are sold for around twelve million euros to the new owner. The Swiss company Meyer Burger wants to produce solar cells in Freiberg and Bitterfeld-Wolfen. The production was expected to start in the first half of 2021.

== History ==
SolarWorld was founded in 1988 as individual company by engineer and chief executive officer Frank Asbeck, and engaged in projects to produce renewable energy. In 1998, these activities were transferred to the newly founded SolarWorld AG, which went public on 11 August 1999.

In 2006 Shell divested its crystalline silicon solar business activities to SolarWorld.

SolarWorld has received German Sustainability Award in the category of "Germany’s Most Sustainable Production 2008".

Since 2010 the company has a joint venture with Qatar Solar Technologies (QSTec). Due to a financial crisis, Solarworld was restructured and QSTec became the largest shareholder in 2013.

In 2012, Washington, D.C.–based law firm, Wiley Rein, was hacked. According to Bloomberg News, the hackers wanted information about the German manufacturer SolarWorld. SolarWorld's computers were hacked about the same time.

In 2016, SolarWorld started ‘gradually’ migrating cell production to PERC and five busbar technology. At the core of SolarWorld's high-tech strategy is migrating all solar cell production to PERC (Passivated Emitter Rear Cell) technology and moving from three busbars to five in order to boost conversion efficiencies and limit capital expenditures at the same time as these changes are relatively simple and low-risk ramps, compared to entire new cell concepts such as heterojunction, according to Neuhaus at PV CellTech. SolarWorld's PV CellTech presentation also revealed that average efficiencies of PERC cells in high-volume production had achieved 21.4%, resulting in PV module power distribution average of 303.3W. SolarWorld has also developed a bi-facial version of its current PERC cell that has entered production and more capacity is expected to be allocated to bi-facial cells and modules.

On May 10, 2017, SolarWorld AG filed for insolvency citing “ongoing price distortions” and “no longer a positive forecast for the future”. According to Mr. Piepenburg, the administrator, it is now of major importance to maintain business operations as smoothly as possible. In May 2016, a lawsuit brought by U.S. silicon supplier Hemlock was reported as "threatening the continued existence of the company" with damage claims up to $770 million.

The German facilities of SolarWorld were purchased by its founder Frank Asbeck in conjunction with Qatar Solar Technologies. Three days later, an appeals court upheld the verdict in the Hemlock case, resulting in SolarWorld AG being responsible to pay the damage claims.

SolarWorld Americas, the largest U.S. crystalline-silicon solar manufacturer for more than 42 years, is continuing to implement efficiencies and working with external partners to position the company for stabilization and a continued competitive position in the marketplace. Solarworld USA spokesman Ben Santarris said the company is sticking with the assumption of continuing normal operations, and continued to work with suppliers and customers to determine what the right size of the company should be going forward.

On August 18, 2017, however, news came that the German administrator of SolarWorld AG's bankruptcy had put SolarWorld Americas up for sale, though no potential buyers had been identified at that time. The US-based subsidiary, which reportedly produced half of "SolarWorld" branded modules worldwide, was put "in something of a limbo" by the bankruptcy and a spokesperson stated the company had entered an "open ended" mergers and acquisitions process.

In April 2018, Solarworld Americas was purchased by SunPower Corporation, seeking to expand their manufacturing capacity in the US. However, they soon decided to scale back their production due to shifts in the solar power industry, and finally decided to close their Hillsboro facility in January 2021, likely due to effects of the COVID-19 pandemic.

== Facilities ==
Within the SolarWorld Group many specialized workers were employed in the enterprise's units located in Bonn (headquarters), Freiberg, and Hillsboro, Oregon (US headquarters).

The business also had a manufacturing facility in Hillsboro, Oregon, purchased in 2007 from Japan's Komatsu Group. In 2008, it was the largest solar cell manufacturing facility in North America. That factory was taken over by SunPower in October 2018, as part of SunPower's acquisition of SolarWorld Americas. Sunpower decided to close the facility in January 2021.

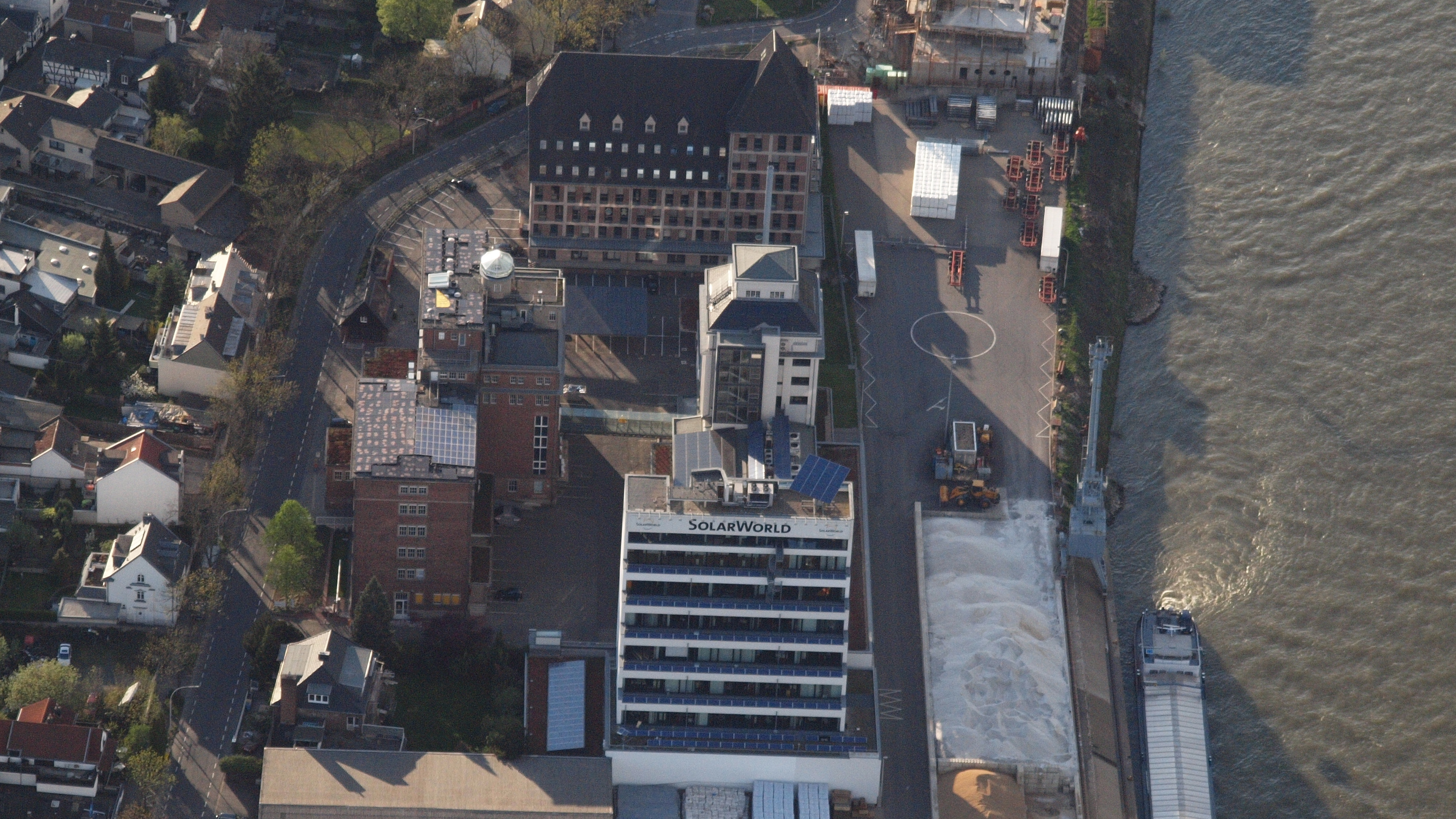
International distribution center in Bonn, Germany

In 2013 SolarWorld took over production from Bosch Solar Energy in Arnstadt and continued to employ about 800 workers.

SolarWorld AG has sales offices in Germany, Spain, US, South Africa, UK and Singapore.

== Grid parity ==
In 2010, SolarWorld called for lowering Germany's lucrative solar feed-in tariffs and its CEO, Frank Asbeck, supported a 10 percent to 15 percent drop for the incentives. In 2011, utility-scale solar power stations achieved grid parity for domestic consumers as guaranteed tariffs fell below retail electricity prices. Feed-in tariffs continued to drop well below the gross domestic electricity price. Since the beginning of 2012, newly installed, small rooftop PV system also have achieved grid parity. The current policy is to revise tariffs on a monthly basis reducing them by 1 percent unless actual deployment does not meet agreed upon targets. As of spring 2015, tariffs ranged from 8 to 12 euro-cents per kilowatt-hour depending on the PV system's size.

== Vehicles ==
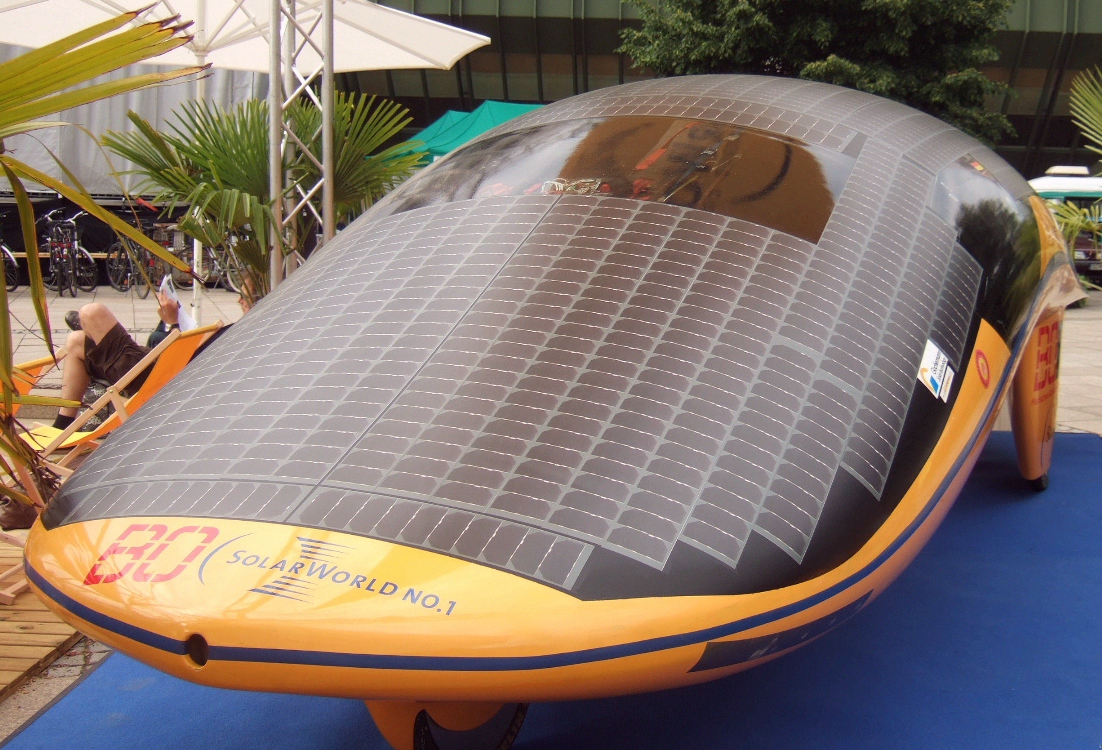
The solar car SolarWorld No. 1

SolarWorld is the main sponsor of the SolarWorld No. 1 solar car developed by the FH Bochum SolarCar Team.

On November 19, 2008, SolarWorld AG announced a bid to buy German automaker Opel from General Motors. The bid was for 1 billion Euro, 250 million being paid in cash and 750 million being paid in bank credits. SolarWorld specified conditions such as Opel should be split from General Motors. Solarworld announced that it intends to create the first electric automotive OEM. However, GM rejected the bid saying "Opel is not for sale".
