= TenKsolar =

Photovoltaic system company

tenKsolar
- Company type: Private
- Industry: Solar Energy
- Founded: 2008
- Headquarters: 9549 Penn Avenue South, Minneapolis, MN, 55431 United States
- Area served: United States
- Key people: Dallas W. Meyer (President, Chief Technical Officer); Jeffrey J. Hohn (Chief Executive Officer); Dr. Lowell Berg (Vice President of Engineering); Joel Cannon (Chief Strategy Officer)
- Products: tenKsolar RAIS® Wave System
- Website: tenksolar.com

tenKsolar is a company that designs, manufactures and markets an integrated photovoltaic system that leverages integrated electronics and a low-voltage, parallel architecture. Compared to conventional solar systems, the architecture provides 45% better energy density, higher reliability, and is the only PV system that is both shock and arch flash safe.

== History ==
Early in 2008, Dallas Meyer began developing the intellectual property for the company's proprietary technology. Later that year, the company was capitalized with $8 million in investments.

In 2009, tenKsolar formed a strategic partnership with Minneapolis-based thin-film manufacturer 3M, which supplies tenKsolar with reflective film to boost light concentration onto the solar panels. This helped the company's RAIS (Redundant Array of Integrated Solar) Wave produce up to 50 percent more energy per square foot than a standard solar array.

In September 2010, tenKsolar shipped its first panels and generated about $3 million in revenue. Throughout the year, the company raised about $5.64 million in investments and launched a Series B round of solar panels to boost its sales. Its primary shareholders include PrairieGold Venture Partners and the National Rural Telecommunications Cooperative.

In April 2012, Hanwha Corp (008800) and ESP Novusmodus LP, a fund backed by Irish state utility Electricity Supply Board, led a $15.5 million Series B investment in tenKsolar.

On July 8, 2013, tenKsolar announced a strategic alliance with Gehrlicher North America to deploy high-efficiency RAIS into solar PV projects in the North American market.

In May 2017, tenKsolar announced it was suspending operations.

== Technology ==
The RAIS WAVE technology by tenKsolar integrates PV modules with power electronics, static reflection, and racking arranged in a wave design suitable for installation on flat roofs. The cells, modules, and inverters are connected in parallel in order to operate at a system voltage of 50 V. Such configuration ensures that the chances of single points of failures, arc flashes, and high-voltage shock risks are minimized. When integrated with power electronics, the PV system makes use of the module integrated reflector to achieve static and non-uniform reflections in order to generate more energy from each installed Watt.

TenK vs. Traditional Solar Traditional solar systems generally include independently developed modules, racking, and inverters. The cells and modules are wired in a series of strings, thereby building up voltage to 300 V to 1000 V strings of modules. The module strings are connected to centralized or string inverters that operate at 200 V to 1000 V.

Performance: Traditional systems, because of their serial architecture, can suffer significant performance issues due to individual cell issues, module issues, or even light shading. One cell failure within a module will bring down the performance of that whole module. A module performance issue or outright failure will in turn bring down the performance of the whole string of modules. In a traditional serial system, the performance of the system depends on its worst performing component, and that will have a material cascading impact to the overall system. In tenK's system, a cell issue will impact only that cell, and a module performance issue will impact only that module. The performance issue is isolated, and has an immaterial impact to the overall system. Likewise, shading has an impact only on the shaded component, and does not impact the rest of the system.

Safety: Conventional systems can generate both life-threatening shocks and arc flashes. Both installers and firefighters must take strict precautions when working with PV systems. UL has indicated that PV systems can cause death to firefighters if not treated properly. In September 2013, a 250,000-square-foot warehouse burned down due to the firefighters’ inability to properly fight a fire due to concerns about the safety of a conventional system. Due to tenK's inherent low voltage, and its internal ground fault detection, there is no risk of life-threatening shocks of fire causing flash arcs. The system is marketed as 100% safe.

In May 2011, tenKsolar released its third-generation 180 W RAIS® photovoltaic module, which is built with high efficiency mono-crystalline solar cells configured in a proprietary cell matrix configuration. The system reportedly generates up to 60% more energy per roof.

In August 2012, tenKsolar announced a 420 W poly-crystalline or the 440 W mono-crystalline PV module. It is a larger module that is tilted at 22 degrees.

== Termination of Business ==
In May 2017, Ten K Solar announced it was terminating most of its business activities. Widespread failure of inverters was blamed for flagging sales and rising warranty/ repair claims.
