= Neo Solar Power =

Taiwan-based solar manufacturer

Neo Solar Power Corporation
- Type: Public (TWSE: 3576)
- Industry: Solar Photovoltaics, Photovoltaics, Optoelectronics
- Founded: 2005
- Headquarters: Hsinchu, Taiwan
- Key people: Dr. Quincy Lin ( Honorary Chairman & CSO); Dr. Sam Hong (Chairman & CEO); Andy Shen (President)
- Products: Solar Cell & Module &Solar System
- Revenue: US$ 420 million (2012)
- Number of employees: ~2,400 (2013)
- Website: www.nsp.com

Neo Solar Power Energy Corp. (traditional Chinese: 新日光能源), also known as NSP, is a Taiwan-based solar cell and module manufacturer. The company was ranked one of the global top ten solar cell manufacturers by capacity in 2013 and the largest solar cell producer by revenue in Taiwan. Neo Solar Power has merged into United Renewable Energy Co., Ltd. (3576.TW).

== History and company developments ==
Founded in 2005, Neo Solar Power is a crystalline silicon solar cell manufacturer that is publicly listed on the Taiwan Stock Exchange. The company was ranked No. 6 in the 2009 Deloitte Technology Fast 500 Asia Pacific Ranking and CEO Survey. In August 2011, Dr. Sam Hong, CEO of Neo Solar Power Corp., has been elected the Chairman of the Taiwan Photovoltaic Industry Association (TPVIA).

On May 31, 2013, Neo Solar Power merged Delsolar and has become the largest solar cell producer in Taiwan by capacity.

On October 17, 2017, it was reported that NSP signed a letter of intent to merge with solar cell producers Gintech Energy Corp (昱晶能源) and Solartech Energy Corp (昇陽光電) in order to improve global competitiveness. The merger is to be executed via share swaps in the third quarter of 2018, creating a new company called United Renewable Energy Corporation (聯合再生能源股份有限公司). The company would be the second-largest solar company in the world in terms of installed capacity.
