= SolarPark Korea =

SolarPark Korea Co., Ltd.
- Industry: Renewable Energy, Photovoltaics
- Founded: 2008
- Headquarters: Wanju, South Korea
- Key people: Hyunwoo Park (Chairman); Jongkook Lee(Vice President)
- Products: Photovoltaic modules
- Revenue: $508 million (2010)
- Number of employees: 300 (October 2011)

SolarPark Korea Co., Ltd. is a South Korean crystalline silicon module manufacturer. Founded in 2008 as a German-Korean joint venture, the company combines German and Korean machinery and engineering in its automated module fabrication lines. In June 2011, SolarPark Korea became a 100% subsidiary of the SolarPark Co., Ltd.

== History ==
April 1981
The automated machinery company INMAC is established in Sogong-dong, Joong-gu, Seoul, Korea

July 1990
A new factory is established in Songne-dong, Soda-gu, Bucheon-si, Gyeonggi-do, Korea The headquarters is relocated to the same location

March 1997
INMAC is selected as a prospective medium & small enterprise of Gyeonggi-do

April 1999
INMAC is selected as a prospective medium & small exporting enterprise (Small & Medium Business Corporation)

April 2007
Establishment of SolarPark Co., Ltd.

November 2007
SolarPark is awarded the 3 Million Dollar Export Tower Award and presidential citation during the 44th Trade day

April 2008
Establishment of SolarPark Korea Co., Ltd.(Previously SolarWorl Korea Co., Ltd) Established as a 50/50 JV with SolarWorld AG

September 2008
Construction of Gochang Solar Park(15MWp) completed

November 2008
SolarPark Korea completes the first stage construction of its module production factory (annual capacity 60 MW)

September 2009
Solarpark Korea completes the second stage construction of its module production factory (annual capacity 90 MW)

February 2010
Construction of the Inline Mechanics Co., Ltd. factory completed

April 2010
SolarPark Korea completes the third stage construction of its module production factory (annual capacity 100 MW)

'Total capacity : 250 MW'

October 2010
IEC 61215, 61730-1, 61730-2 certifications received

November 2010
SolarPark Korea is awarded the Ston Tower Industrial Medal for achieving 300 million dollars in exports during the 47th Trade Day

June 2011
SolarWorld AG's 50% share of SolarPark Korea is acquired by SolarPark Korea. SolarPark Korea now owns 100% of shares

September 2011
ISO 9001 & ISO 14001 certifications received

April 2012
Construction of second module production factory (annual capacity : 300 MW + 50 MW) completed

'Total capacity : 600 MW, 5th largest production capacity in Asia (excluding Chinese manufacturers)'

'July 2012
Merger of the 3 companies; SolarPark Korea Co., Ltd., SolarPark Co., Ltd., and Inline Mechanics Co., Ltd, completed.

Oct 2012
Passed PID test by TUV-SUD

== Automation in production ==
SolarPark Korea espouses automation in production to achieve consistent high-quality, high-volume and cost-competitive output. Its module production lines achieve a capacity-per-employee of 0.83 MW.

SolarPark Korea's production lines comprise machines from equipment makers such as Somont, 3S, Berger Lichttechnik, Pasan and Schleich. Equipment integration is provided by affiliate Inline Mechanics.
