= IBC Solar =

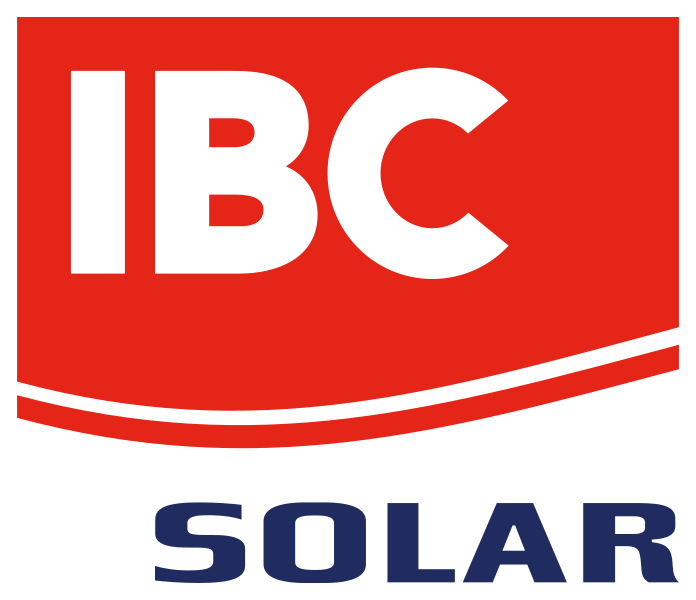
- Company type: Privately held company
- Industry: Renewable Energy, Photovoltaics
- Founded: 1982
- Founder: Udo Moehrstedt
- Headquarters: Bad Staffelstein, Germany
- Key people: Udo Möhrstedt (CEO); Stefan Horstmann (COO); Lars Degendorfer (CFO)
- Revenue: ▲€ 332 million EUR (2020)
- Net income: 73,490,469.7 euro (2020)
- Number of employees: 365 (2020)
- Website: www.ibc-solar.com

IBC Solar is a company based in Germany which specializes in custom solar panel installations (photovoltaics). The company was established in 1982.

Founder and CEO of the company, Udo Möhrstedt, was named Entrepreneur of the Year 2009 in the trade category by Ernst & Young.

IBC Solar has six regional companies in Germany, the Netherlands, South Africa, India, Japan and Singapore. In 2019, the company generated a consolidated global turnover of 332 million Euro.

Their distribution network for solar products covers over 1000 distributors and wholesalers across over 30 different countries.

== Products and projects ==
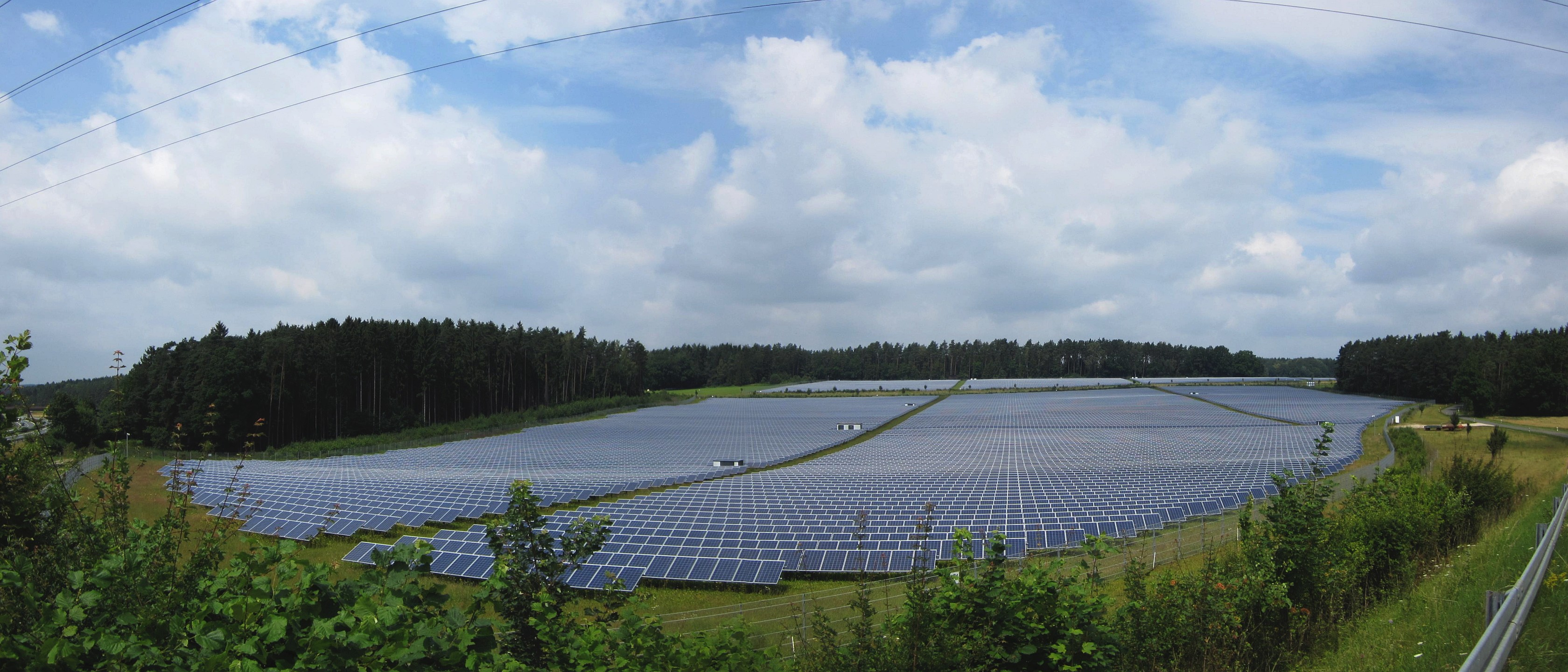
Jura Solarpark (43 MWp) in Weismain-Buckendorf, Franconian Jura

IBC Solar markets modules and components of renowned manufacturers and also distributes its own product line through domestic retail partners. While a big part of its business is generated through a network of local installation partners, the company also specializes in the planning and implementation of photovoltaic systems for large commercial clients, as well as subsequent monitoring of the systems.

For example, the company has installed a PV power station with a peak output of 13.2 Megawatts in Spain near Alicante, which has been producing electricity since 2008. This project was conducted together with the electricity provider Enercoop. For Greenpeace Energy, a German green energy utility provider, IBC Solar planned and implemented one of the largest PV roof systems in the world on the Stuttgart trade fair center (Messe Stuttgart).

== Cooperation's and partnerships ==
IBC Solar AG has long term contracts with solar cell manufactures as well as solar panel suppliers. On a test field near the company headquarters, the company tests the long-term efficiency and reliability of the modules and inverters in its portfolio. Based on the findings from its long-term testing, IBC SOLAR has defined criteria for modules and inverters with manufactures and markets these products under their own brand.

IBC Solar’s international business has been supported by the German energy agency’s solar roof program. By providing German companies with the opportunity to show their expertise in beacon projects in international markets, Dena supports the market entry of German companies. Companies interested in international projects have to apply for one of the projects the energy agency award each year. As part of the solar roof program, IBC SOLAR has installed photovoltaic systems on the roofs of the German school in Rome and Lisbon, as well as the Goethe-Institute and Max Mueller Bhavan in Bangalore. In 2008, IBC solar entered into partnership with Indian company Refex Energy to explore opportunities in India.
