= Cool Earth Solar =

- Type: Private
- Founded: 2006
- Founder: Eric Cummings
- Headquarters: Stockton, California, United States
- Key people: Rob Lamkin (CEO
- Website: coolearthsolar.com

Cool Earth Solar has developed concentrated photovoltaic (CPV) technology to build solar power plants. The company is headquartered in Stockton, California, US, and in 2008 closed its Series A round of funding with Quercus Trust as the lead investor. The company was founded in 2006 by Dr. Eric Cummings. Energy industry veteran Rob Lamkin joined the company as CEO in 2007.

== CPV technology ==
Solar systems based on CPV technology focus and magnify sunlight onto a small area of PV materials to produce energy. CPV systems use fewer material resources than traditional solar systems in an attempt to lower solar energy production costs. The end goal for the solar industry is to achieve grid parity, so that the cost of solar energy is on par, or below, the cost of energy from traditional fossil fuels.

Challenges CPV companies face include the need for large upfront capital investment to develop and deploy their solutions. CPV technology works only in direct sunlight, as diffuse light resulting from cloudy or overcast conditions cannot be concentrated. This limits the regions that are suitable for CPV-based solar plants.

== Market opportunity for solar energy ==
There is rising demand for solar energy in the United States based on government clean energy mandates. Many states require energy supply companies to produce a specific portion of their electricity from renewable sources. As of July 2010, 29 states plus the District of Columbia have state-mandated renewable portfolio standards (RPSs), and another seven states have goals, of obtaining from 10 to 33 percent of their electricity from renewable sources. Utilities will rely on renewable energy companies to meet RPS mandates.

== Technical details ==
Plastic is a key material in Cool Earth Solar’s solar concentrators, which are inflated with ordinary air to provide structural support without using metal. Plastic keeps the amount of metal and glass at a minimum to lower production costs. Plastic is a plentiful, inexpensive material. The current global market for polyethylene terephthalate (PET) film is approximately 1.69 million metric tonnes or 3.9 billion pounds per year.

Each concentrator uses two pounds of plastic, and measures 10 feet in diameter and four feet in depth. The front face of the concentrator is clear to allow the light to pass through: the back half of the concentrator is reflective (coated in a very thin film of aluminum) to form a giant parabolic mirror that concentrates light about 300 to 400 times, while using up to 400 times less solar cell material than traditional flat-panel PV systems. The concentrators, like a magnifying glass, must point directly at the sun to work. The curved reflector serves to concentrate the light from a very large surface area onto a small focal point inside the plastic shell where a solar receiver sits (solar cells). All of the light that is striking the concentrator across the full circular area is reflected to the same spot, as long as the concentrator is pointed at the sun. The wide hemisphere faces the sun. The concentrators are mounted on poles in rigid rigs (ten feet above the ground); the rigs allow a computer system to move the concentrators as they track the sun on a dual axis.

The company is a member of the American Council on Renewable Energy (ACORE), Solar Energy Industries Association (SEIA), and Solar Electric Power Association (SEPA).
