= Aleo Solar =

- Company type: GmbH
- Industry: renewable energies
- Founded: 2001
- Headquarters: Prenzlau (Brandenburg), Germany
- Key people: Günter Schulze CEO, William Chen CSO
- Products: Photovoltaic modules
- Number of employees: 320 (01/2015)
- Parent: Sino-American Silicon Products (Taiwan)
- Website: www.aleo-solar.com

Aleo Solar GmbH produces and distributes solar modules and systems. It was founded in 2001. Its plant in Prenzlau, Germany, provided the company with an annual production capacity of 280 megawatts by 2015.

== Company ==
The company was founded in 2001 originally as S.M.D. Solar-Manufaktur Deutschland GmbH & Co.KG in Prenzlau and started in August 2002 with the production of solar modules. In 2005, S.M.D. was renamed Aleo Solar AG. The company went public in July 2006 and is listed on the Frankfurt Stock Exchange (ISIN: DE000A0JM634). Bosch secured a majority stake in the company in 2009. The Bosch Group holds a 90% majority shareholding; the balance is free-floating. Altogether there are about 1,600 small shareholders. In April 2014, Aleo Solar AG announced its liquidation. In May 2014, the production in Prenzlau and the brand "aleo" were sold to Aleo Solar GmbH (former SCP Solar GmbH).

Their distribution network for solar panels covers over 65 distributors and wholesalers, across over 21 different countries.

== Facilities ==
The production site is in Prenzlau. The company has established a subsidiary in Italy.

== Board ==
- Günter Schulze, Managing Director (CEO)
- William Chen, Managing Director (CSO)

== Awards ==
In June 2006, the Aleo Solar S_16 became the best in testing by Stiftung Warentest. The German magazine Öko-Test (edition April 2010) awarded the Aleo S_18 with the distinction “Very Good.”
