= HelioSphera =

- Company type: Privately held company
- Industry: Solar power generation
- Founded: 2007
- Headquarters: Athens, Greece
- Number of locations: 5 (including sales offices in Hamburg, Germany; and Milan, Italy)
- Key people: Stavros Konstantinidis, CEO and President of the Board of Directors; Christos Trizoglou, General Manager
- Products: Photovoltaic solar panels and modules, Thin-film micormorph-tandem technology modules
- Number of employees: Approximately 180
- Website: www.heliosphera.com

HelioSphera S.A. is a Greek company founded in 2007, with major stakeholders in Greece and the United States of America. Its headquarters is in Athens, Greece, and its production facility is in Tripoli, Greece. The company's primary product was photovoltaic solar panels and modules, made of micromorph thin-film with an annual capacity of 60MWp. The company ceased production in 2012 after falling victim to Chinese competition and it was declared bankrupt in 2017.

The Heliosphera factory including land, buildings and equipment are due to be sold at auction by the Hellenic Public Properties Co. (HPPC) on their e-auctions platform in 2025. The sale includes two adjacent plots of land totalling 26,930 square meters plus an additional 2,200 square meter plot. The factory houses a photovoltaic panel production unit consisting of a basement, ground floor, and first floor of buildings and offices with warehouses. The mechanical equipment (by Oerlikon Solar, Rena GmbH, ABB, Buerkle GmbH, Nisshibo, Schiller Autom, Olbricht GmbH and others) is fully or partially fixed and interconnected in a single production process. Lantana Capital, a London based boutique specialising in distressed assets has been mandated by the creditors as sell side advisor. They can be contacted for further information.

The Heliosphera factory is located in the Tripoli Industrial Area (BIPE) 170 km from Athens & Piraeus Port, 75km from Corinth, 145km from Patras and 65km from Kalamata. Tripoli is conveniently located for the Argolic Gulf ports of Astros, Nafplio and Kheli Harbour with good road connections to the rest of Greece through the Corinth-Tripoli-Kalamata motorway or Moreas Motorway (A7) & Europe.

== History ==
In January 2008 ground was broken in Tripoli, Greece for the company's production facility. The Micromorph thin-film plant was built in 18 months, from an investment of 180m Euros. The state-of-the-art, 27,000 m^{2} facility, with a clean room of over 1500 m^{2} launched production in September 2009. A month later the certification process according to IEC61646 and IEC61730 was completed by TÜV-Rheinland, with two mounting solutions for BIPV and ground mounted systems offered. Production started in the fourth quarter of 2009, and the ramp-up was completed in the third quarter of 2010. In 2010, 92% of the production was exported, and projects in Germany, Italy, Slovakia, France, Greece, Belgium, Israel, the Czech Republic, Japan and elsewhere have been commissioned, including large scale ground mounted systems and medium to small scale rooftop installations.

== Products ==
The company's micromorph modules are manufactured to perform in low light conditions, partial shading or high temperatures. HelioSphera S.A., one of the first companies to start module production in Greece, is the only thin film (micromorph-Si) producer in Greece.
