= Glava, Sweden =

Glava
- Location within Sweden
- Coordinates: 59°33′N 12°33′E
- Country: Sweden
- Province: Värmland
- County: Värmland County
- Municipality: Arvika Municipality

Area
  - Total: 0.95 km^{2} (0.37 sq mi)

Population (2005-12-31)
  - Total: 201
  - Density: 212/km^{2} (550/sq mi)
- Time zone: UTC+1 (CET)
  - Summer (DST): UTC+2 (CEST)

Glava is a village situated in Arvika Municipality, Värmland County, Sweden with 201 inhabitants in 2005.
