= Wagner & Co Solar Technology =

German-based solar power company

Wagner
- Industry: Solar power systems
- Founded: 1979
- Headquarters: Cölbe, Germany
- Number of locations: 5
- Products: Photovoltaics
- Number of employees: Over 400
- Website: www.wagner-solar.com

Wagner & Co. Solar Technology is a German-based solar power company. Its main headquarters are located at Cölbe, Germany. The company's products include solar, solar thermal and pellet-heating systems. The company has branches in France, Spain, the United Kingdom and the United States.

== History ==
Wagner & Co. was founded in 1979 in Germany by a group of environmental technology students. The students wanted to create an ecological alternative to environmental damage and nuclear energy. This desire led to the development and production of a range of solar thermal systems, photovoltaic systems and wood pellet heating systems (Solar Thermal World). Wagner now is a staff-owned company that employs more than 400 employees within a democratic company structure.

== Recognition ==
In 2010, Wagner & Co was nominated as one of the top three most sustainable brands in the running for the German Sustainability Award (Deutscher).
