= Wafering =

Wafering is the process by which a silicon crystal (boule) is made into wafers. This process is usually carried out by a multi-wire saw which cuts multiple wafers from the same crystal at the same time. These wafers are then polished to the desired degree of flatness and thickness.

In the past, conventional circular saws were used during the 1950s and 1960s, followed by inner diameter saws in the 1970s and 1980s. These saws had diamond particles embedded into their blades to cut silicon. Multi-wire saws were introduced during the early 2000s. The motivation behind this evolution was to reduce material losses from the saw's kerf, and to improve wafer's surface quality, flatness, and bow.

== See also ==
- Wafer (electronics)
- Monocrystalline silicon
