= Renewable Energy Corporation =

Solar power company in Singapore

REC Solar Holdings AS
- Type: Public (Allmennaksjeselskap)
- Traded as: OSE: REC
- Industry: Solar energy
- Founded: 1996; 30 years ago in Oslo, Norway
- Headquarters: 20 Tuas South Avenue 14, Singapore
- Products: Polysilicon, wafers, solar cells, solar modules
- Revenue: NOK 13.78 billion (2010)
- Operating income: NOK 1.018 billion (2010)
- Net income: NOK 989 million (2010)
- Total assets: NOK 36.87 billion (end 2010)
- Total equity: NOK 22.15 billion (end 2010)
- Number of employees: 4,200 (end 2010)
- Parent: Reliance New Energy Solar
- Website: www.recgroup.com

The Renewable Energy Corporation (REC) is a solar power company with headquarters in Singapore. REC produces silicon materials for photovoltaics (PV) applications and multicrystalline wafers, as well as solar cells and modules. It is a wholly owned subsidiary of Reliance New Solar Energy Limited.

The previous parent company of REC was ChemChina, one of the largest chemical companies and state-owned by the People's Republic of China, which held its stake in Elkem since 2015 through the China National Bluestar Group. The purchase price was 490 million euros. On 10 October 2021, Indian conglomerate Reliance Industries announced that its subsidiary, Reliance New Solar Energy Limited, had acquired complete control of REC from China National Bluestar Group for US$771 million.

== History ==
The predecessor of today's company was established in 1996 under the name Fornybar Energi AS. Today's company is a result of a fusion in September 2000 between ScanWafer AS, SolEnergy AS and Fornybar Energi AS. In 2002 REC ScanCell started production of multicrystalline solar cells in Narvik for the sister company REC ScanModule in Glava, Arvika. REC Wafer was at the time the world's largest producer of multicrystalline wafers with factories in Glomfjord and at Herøya.

Immediately after its IPO in 2006, the share price of the company soared, reaching a peak of NOK 262 in November 2007, corresponding to a market capitalization of NOK 174 billion. Based on this value, the company was at the time the largest wholly privately owned company in Norway.

In 2007, REC decided to build its new world-scale integrated solar manufacturing facility in Singapore, the world’s largest integrated solar manufacturing complex. When completed, the manufacturing complex was planned to incorporate wafer, cell and module production facilities, with a production capacity of up to 1.5 gigawatts (GW).

The development of this site was projected to enable REC’s ability to deliver solar products that can compete with traditional energy sources in the sunny areas of the world without government incentives.

In 2008 and 2009 two new factories for multicrystalling wafers were opened at Herøya.

In August 2008 REC made the decision to build a new facility for silicon manufacturing expansion in Bécancour, Quebec, Canada. Included in the decision is a 20-year power contract with Hydro-Québec for the delivery of electricity at a competitive industrial rate.

In 2010, fully automated and integrated production of wafers, cells, and panels began at the company's state-of-the-art factory in Singapore

=== Crisis during 2008-2009 ===
During 2008 and 2009, the company faced a crisis with falling income and increasing debt. As of May 2010, the market capitalization is down to 18 billion NOK. The large drop in value was partially blamed on the 2008 financial crisis, which caused a near halving of the price of silicon wafers, as well as increasing costs of investments, in particular due to delays in opening a new factory in Moses Lake, Washington.

=== Crisis during 2011 and 2012 ===
In addition due to the continued weak market conditions and prospects of significant negative cash flow, the board of directors announced in October that REC would permanently close down the production capacity at the oldest multicrystalline wafer plants at Herøya, the multicrystalline wafer plant in Glomfjord and the solar cell plant in Narvik. The remaining Norwegian plant, at Herøya, was closed down in 2012. Its wafer subsidiary, REC Wafer Norway AS, is planning to file for insolvency.

All of REC's solar cell and wafer production plants in Norway were shut down permanently in 2011 and 2012 due to weak market conditions and prospects of significant negative cash flow.

=== Split ===
In 2013, REC announced that it would establish REC Solar as an independently listed company, and REC will continue operating in polysilicon business. REC changed its name to REC Silicon in October 2013. The splinter company consisted of the silicon manufacturing facilities at Moses Lake, Washington and Butte, Montana and is based in the United States. At these plants, REC Silicon produces polysilicon and silane gas for the solar industry and the electronics industry. REC Silicon produced 21,405 MT of polysilicon in 2012, and targets a production of 20,000 MT polysilicon in 2013.

=== Present day ===
In 2023, REC announced the REC@NUS Corporate R&D Laboratory for Next Generation Photovoltaics project with the National University of Singapore.

Polysilicon, capacity & production
| Location | Country | Product | Capacity (MT) | | | | | | Production (MT) | | | | | | | |
| Location | Country | Product | 2006 | 2007 | 2008 | 2009 | 2010 | 2011 | 2006 | 2007 | 2008 | 2009 | 2010 | 2011 | 2012 | 2013 |
|---|---|---|---|---|---|---|---|---|---|---|---|---|---|---|---|---|
| Moses Lake, Washington and Butte, Montana | USA | Polysilicon | - | - | 6000^{1} | 6500 | 17000^{1} | 17000^{1} | 5555 | 5780 | 6241 | 7023 | 13673 | 19050 | 21702 | 19764 |

^{1} Estimated production/capacity

== Operations ==
=== Solar ===
REC produce multicrystalline solar cells and solar panels.

Solar cells and solar panels, capacity & production
| Location | Country | Type | Capacity (MW) | | | | | | |
| Location | Country | Type | 2006 | 2007 | 2008 | 2009 | 2010 | 2011 | 2012 |
|---|---|---|---|---|---|---|---|---|---|
| Porsgrunn | Norway | Multicrystalline cells | - | - | - | 250 | 250^{1} | 250^{1} | 0 ^{3} |
| Tuas | Singapore | Multicrystalline cells | - | - | - | - | - | 530^{1} | 650 ^{1} |
| Glava | Sweden | Multicrystalline modules | - | - | - | 150 | 150^{1} | 0^{3} | 0^{3} |
| Tuas | Singapore | Multicrystalline modules | - | - | - | - | - | 590^{1} | 800 ^{1} |

^{1} Estimated production/capacity
^{2} Numbers not available
^{3} Plant closed down

== Commercial agreements ==
REC has entered into a significant long-term agreement for supply of mono-crystalline silicon wafer to Suniva, Inc. Under the agreement, REC will until 2013 deliver wafers worth more than US$300 million.

REC also entered into a significant long-term agreement for supply of mono-crystalline silicon wafers to China Sunergy Co. Ltd. Under the agreement, REC were to deliver wafers worth more than US$400 million until 2015. It was structured as a take-or-pay contract with pre-determined prices and volumes for the entire contract period. However, in 2009, this contract became the cause of a legal battle between REC and China Sunergy. As spot prices for wafers fell dramatically in 2009, China Sunergy found itself bound to prices well below spot, prompting a stall in purchasing, leading REC to terminate the contract.

== Listings ==
The shares are listed on the Photovoltaik Global 30 Index since the beginning of this stock index in 2009. During the past few years REC's stock price has gradually come down as a result of the demanding times in the solar industry due to overcapacity and heavy price pressure on solar products.

== See also ==
- Economic Development Board (EDB)
- Low cost solar cell
- Take-or-pay contract
