= Suniva =

US manufacturer of photovoltaic solar cells

- Industry: Photovoltaic Manufacturing
- Founded: 1 January 2006; 2008
- Founder: Dr. Ajeet Rohatgi
- Headquarters: Norcross, GA, US
- Key people: Dr. Ajeet Rohatgi (Founder); John Baumstark (CEO), Matt Card
- Products: Photovoltaic Cells and Modules
- Parent: Lion Point Capital LP
- Website: www.suniva.com

Suniva is an American owned, U.S. based manufacturer of crystalline silicon photovoltaic (PV) solar cells. Headquartered in metropolitan Atlanta, with a cell manufacturing facility in Georgia, Suniva has sold its PV products globally.

Suniva's distribution network for solar panels covered over 53 distributors and wholesalers, across seven countries.

== History ==
Suniva spun out of Georgia Institute of Technology's University Center of Excellence in Photovoltaics and the work of Dr. Ajeet Rohatgi in 2007. Dr. Rohatgi is the founder and director of the photovoltaic (PV) research program at Georgia Tech (since 1985) and the founding director of the U.S. Department of Energy-funded University Center of Excellence in Photovoltaics (UCEP). Suniva built its first manufacturing plant in Norcross, GA in 2008, which had an initial production capacity of 32 MW and has since expanded to over 400 MW. In July 2014, Suniva announced its 200 MW module facility in Saginaw, MI.

Following a successful reorganization and exit from Bankruptcy in 2019, Suniva is now owned by Lion Point Capital, a New York based investment firm.

== 2017 Sections 201 & 202 Trade Complaint ==
In April 2017, Suniva filed for bankruptcy. Then the company filed trade complaints against its international competitors under Sections 201 and 202 of the Trade Act of 1974 with the ITC eight days later. It asks for “global safeguard relief” from imports of crystalline silicon solar PV cells and modules. SolarWorld joined the complaint a month later.

Opposition within the industry was fierce, with opponents arguing forcefully that a favorable finding on the trade case would destroy the rooftop solar industry by raising the prices of solar modules to unaffordable levels. Suniva and SolarWorld disputed the claims, suggesting that not only would a favorable decision not harm the industry but in fact would create 114,800 jobs instead. Initially only supported by the Congressmen who represented Suniva and SolarWorld's districts, as decision day got closer, more groups came to support the trade petition.

The USITC rendered a unanimous (4/4) decision on Sept. 22 that imports of solar panels had injured domestic manufacturers. Both Suniva and SolarWorld offered their suggestions to the USITC on September 28, 2017.

On 22 January 2018, the Trump administration applied a tariff of 30 percent to imported solar panels. The tariff will last one year before stepping down to 25 percent in 2019, 20 percent in 2020, and 15 percent in 2021. The tariff expired in 2022.
