= Chairman of the Board (disambiguation) =

A chairperson of the board (or chair, chairman, or chairwoman) is a seat of office in an organization, especially of corporations.

Chairman of the board may also refer to:

- Chairman of the Board (film), a 1998 film
- Chairmen of the Board, a 1970s American soul music group
  - The Chairmen of the Board (album), their debut album
- Chairman of the Board (album), a 1959 album by Count Basie
- Chairmen of the Bored, 2008 crunk album by Lord T & Eloise
- Chairman of the Board (single), a 2000 single by Australia band Motor Ace

== Nicknames ==
- Frank Sinatra (1915–1998), frequently referred to as "The Chairman of the Board" (of Reprise Records)
- Whitey Ford (1928–2020), nicknamed "Chairman of the Board"
- Eamonn Coghlan (born 1952), nicknamed "Chairman of the Boards" (note the plural) because of his prowess in the indoor mile run
- Moses Malone (1955–2015), occasionally referred to as "The Chairman of the Boards" for his on-court dominance and rebounding prowess during his tenure in the NBA
- Martin McGrady (1946-2006) more than a decade before Coghlan, McGrady had the pluralized nickname "Chairman of the Boards" for his prowess at the indoor 600 yards on wooden tracks
- David Miscavige (born 1960), frequently referred to by Scientologists as "Chairman of the Board" (or "COB"), his official title, rather than by name
- Page McConnell (born 1963), frequently referred to as "Chairman of the Boards"
- Vince McMahon (born 1945), frequently introduced as "The Chairman of the Board"
- Don "Magic" Juan, nicknamed "The Chairman of the Board"
