= DelSolar =

Solar Company

DelSolar Co., Ltd.
- Company type: Public (Emerging stock) (GTSM: 3599)
- Industry: Solar cell, solar module, and Photovoltaic system
- Founded: 2004
- Founder: Delta Electronics Industrial Technology Research Institute (ITRI)
- Headquarters: Hsinchu, Taiwan
- Number of locations: Taiwan, China, United States, Netherlands
- Key people: RC Liang, Chairman and CEO
- Revenue: US $ 241 M (January–September, 2010)
- Number of employees: 810 (as of Aug 2010)
- Website: http://www.delsolarpv.com

DelSolar (simplified Chinese: 旺能光电; traditional Chinese: 旺能光電; pinyin: wàng néng guāng diàn), commonly abbreviated 旺能)) (3599, TW) is a solar company, a subsidiary of Delta group (台達電子/台達集團), engaging in the research, design, manufacture and distribution of solar cells, solar modules, as well as the development of Photovoltaic system. The company’s headquarters is in Hsinchu, Science-based industrial Park, Phrase II, Taiwan.

== History ==
DelSolar was founded in 2004 by the alliance between the parent company, Delta Electronics and the Industrial Technology Research Institute (ITRI), a non-profit research institute located in Taiwan under the supervision of the Republic of China Ministry of Economic Affairs. DelSolar started its initial solar cell production in 2005 and launched the first solar module series in 2009. The company was listed on Taiwan’s Emerging Board in 2007.

The name DelSolar is a merger of “Delta” and “solar”, the name of the parent company and DelSolar’s main focused industry.

== Product history ==
DelSolar started its initial solar cell production in 2005 with the capacity of 25 megawatts and launched the first solar module series in 2009 with up to 230W power output. The company had 11 production lines with total capacity of 436 megawatts by the end of 2010. DelSolar executed its capacity expansion plans. On 4 June 2010, DelSolar announced its ceremony for Jhunan plant, that was completed and began its mass production in Q2, 2011. The estimated solar cell production capacity can reach 3 GW. The second manufacturing plant, that was planned as a module plant, was expected to be completed at the end of 2012. The module capacities of DelSolar are 45 and 70 megawatts in the Hsinchu and Wujiang plants, respectively. Wujiang plant reached the total solar module capacity at 1 GW in year 2013.

== Market performance ==
In 2009, the total shipment of DelSolar was 90.8 MW. According to the company’s 2009 financial report, total revenues was US$135 M. Approximately 60% of sales were in Europe. DelSolar started their module business in the United States.

== PV system installation ==
=== World games stadium, Kaohsiung, Taiwan: 1MW ===
8,844 solar panels were installed. The project was completed in October, 2008. In the first 9 months, the photovoltaic system has generated 110 million MWh of electricity as the annual amount of electricity agreed in the contract. It generated 1.14 GWh of electricity per year, with the ability to sell surplus energy during the non-game period. The solar panels can reduce annual carbon dioxide output by 660 tons.

=== River of Life Christian Church, California, US: 120kW ===
Approximately 510 230W high power DelSolar solar modules have been mounted on ROLCC’s roof top. The 117 KW system generate 180,800 KWh of clean power annually, more than 4.5 GWh over 25 years. The church will prevent approximately 5 million pounds of greenhouse gas emissions over 25 years.

=== DelSolar (Wujing) plant, Wujing, China: 115 kW ===
The photovoltaic system contains 110 kWp of DelSolar’s standard modules and 4 kWp light-through BIPV modules, which has generated 15,946 degree of electricity so far.

== Products ==
=== Solar cell ===
DelSolar’s solar cell includes monocrystalline and polycrystalline silicon-based cells, with size of 6 inch, 2 busbars or 3 busbars and the wafer thickness of 180 to 200 mm.

=== Solar module ===
DelSolar’s solar module includes monocrystalline and polycrystalline silicon solar modules and black modules. DelSolar’s modules can provide positive power tolerances of up to +3%, which offer a stable and high-energy system output.

== Global operation ==
DelSolar has 3 manufacturing facilities, located at Hsinchu and Jhunan, Taiwan and Wujiang, China, as well as the representative offices in Taiwan, China, United States, and the Netherlands.
