= GCL-Poly =

GCL-Poly 保利协鑫能源控股有限公司
- Type: Limited
- Traded as: SEHK: 3800
- Industry: Industrials; Industrial engineering New energy materials
- Founded: 1996; 30 years ago
- Headquarters: Hong Kong, Cayman Islands
- Area served: Worldwide
- Key people: Zhu Gong Shan
- Parent: Golden Concord Group Limited
- Website: www.gcl-poly.com.hk

GCL-Poly
- Simplified Chinese: 保利协鑫能源控股有限公司
- Traditional Chinese: 保利協鑫能源控股有限公司
Transcriptions
Standard Mandarin
- Hanyu Pinyin: Bǎolì Xié Xīn Néngyuán Kònggǔ Yǒuxiàn Gōngsī

GCL-Poly, founded in 1996, is a subsidiary of Golden Concord Group Limited (GCL), a green energy supplier in China, providing power and heat via cogeneration, incineration and wind power. As of 2009 it was the largest supplier of polysilicon in China, and is also a supplier of electronic wafers for the solar industry.

== History ==
GCL-Poly listed at the Hong Kong Stock Exchange in 2007. The IPO price range was 3.3 to HK $4.1, raising up to 1.181 billion yuan.

In November 2009, China Investment Corporation (CIC) bought a HK$5.5 billion ($710 million) minority stake in GCL-Poly.

On February 14, 2014, GCL-Poly implement Subscription Rosenthal Group 360,000,000 new shares at a price of four yuan per share, a discount of 70.37% compared with before the suspension. The total cost of 1.44 billion yuan in cash. Upon completion, GCL will hold 67.99 percent after Rosenthal enlarged share capital.

In November 2014, GCL-Poly plans a total consideration of 10.1 billion yuan to Zhu Gong Shan and its connected investors to sell about half of the company's profit contribution Xipian manufacturing operations. After Zhu Gong Shan plan then silicon chipalso production business into Shanghai Super Day, and GCL-Poly will shift its focus to upstream polysilicon business. December 19 the same year, GCL-Poly announced the cancellation of the transaction.

In August 2016, GCL-Poly bought $150 million worth assets of SunEdison.

In April 2017, GCL-Poly invested over $832 million in construction of 60,000 tons polysilicon plant in China.

In April 2020 Poly launched a partnership with Hypersolar Inc.

7. GCL-poly is a company that drills oil wells in Jehedin and Elele in OGADEN Region.
