= Canadian Solar =

Canadian photovoltaics company

Canadian Solar Inc.
- Type: Public
- Traded as: Nasdaq: CSIQ
- Industry: Renewable energy; Photovoltaics industry
- Founded: 2001; 25 years ago
- Founder: Dr. Shawn Qu
- Headquarters: Kitchener, Ontario, Canada
- Number of locations: 23 countries and regions on 6 continents
- Key people: Dr. Shawn Qu (chairman, CEO)
- Products: Energy storage; Inverters; Solar panels; Photovoltaic systems
- Number of employees: 22,234 (2023)
- Website: www.canadiansolar.com

Canadian Solar Inc. (NASDAQ: CSIQ) is a global renewable energy company. Headquartered in Kitchener, Ontario, the company manufactures solar PV modules, provides battery energy storage solutions and develops utility-scale solar power and battery energy storage projects.

== History ==
Canadian Solar panels being installed in Greater Manchester, UK

Dr. Shawn Qu founded Canadian Solar in 2001 in Guelph, Ontario. In November 2006, the company went public (Nasdaq: CSIQ), trading at $15 per share. The company acquired the solar developer Recurrent Energy from Sharp Corporation for approximately $265 million in 2015.

In October 2017, Canadian Solar listed the Canadian Solar Infrastructure Fund Inc. (CFSI) on the Tokyo Stock Exchange. The fund’s initial public offering (IPO) of 177,800 investment units was priced at JPY 100,000 (US $879) per unit. The proceeds supported the acquisition of 13 solar power facilities with a combined capacity of 72.7 MWp from Canadian Solar subsidiaries in Japan.

Solar installation at Oxelaëre, France, 2020

In 2021, the firm relocated Recurrent Energy, its subsidiary that develops, owns, and operates solar and energy storage projects globally, to Austin, Texas.

In September 2022, Canadian Solar launched a residential energy storage solution, the EP Cube. Up to six units can be connected to deliver up to 119.9 kWh of energy storage and 45.6 kW output for home use.

In June 2023, Canadian Solar announced plans to construct its first U.S. manufacturing plant in Mesquite, Texas. The $250 million plant, which will employ up to 1,500 people, is designed to assemble 20,000 solar panels a day, totaling 5 GW of annual production capacity. In March 2024, Canadian Solar agreed to supply Sol Systems with solar modules from the finished factory. The company’s other manufacturing centers are in Asia and Canada.

In June 2023, CSI Solar, the solar manufacturing subsidiary of Canadian Solar, completed an IPO and began trading on the Shanghai Stock Exchange. Shares in the IPO were listed at RMB 11.10 (US $1.55) each, with total closing revenue of approximately RMB 6 billion (US $840 million).

In July 2023, the firm's utility-scale battery energy storage subsidiary was rebranded from CSI Energy Storage to e-STORAGE. The subsidiary’s two automated factories supply battery energy storage solutions to the US, Canada, the UK, and China.

In November 2024, Canadian Solar announced plans to construct a $712 million battery plant in Shelbyville, Kentucky. The largest economic development project in Shelby County history, the Shelbyville Battery Manufacturing plant will build utility-scale batteries that utilities and project developers will use for energy storage. Located about 30 miles from downtown Louisville, the one-million-square-foot project will initially have a capacity of 3 GWh, with a second phase expected to double production capacity. Limited production is scheduled to begin in 2025, with full-scale production expected in early 2026.

Canadian Solar participates in the United Nations Global Compact and CDP Climate Change Disclosure as of 2023. Released in 2024, Canadian Solar’s 2023 Corporate Sustainability Report cited ongoing reductions in greenhouse gas emissions and energy, water, and waste intensities.

=== Controversies ===
In 2021, the Human Rights Foundation criticized Canadian Solar after The Globe and Mail reported that the company operated a solar farm in Xinjiang, China, near a Xinjiang re-education camp. The Guelph Mercury Tribune later reported a second solar farm in Xinjiang with ties to a supplier of Canadian Solar. The Globe also reported a 2019 agreement between Canadian Solar and polysilicon manufacturer GCL-Poly, a company whose Xinjiang subsidiary had ties to forced labor. In 2021, Canadian Solar denied any connection to forced labor in its operations or supply chain and was working with polysilicon suppliers to establish auditing processes. Asked about the firm at a press conference, Prime Minister Justin Trudeau said that the government would "follow up with ... all companies that have investments in that area, to ensure they are following Canadian values and Canadian law." Later that year, Canadian Solar sold both of its Xinjiang solar power plants to a consortium of Chinese banks and investment groups and no longer has any Xinjiang locations, The Mercury Tribune reported. In August 2023, the U.S. Department of Commerce ruled that Canadian Solar had circumvented tariffs on Chinese-made goods.

== Manufacturing ==
Canadian Solar operates production facilities in the United States, Canada, China, Indonesia, Vietnam and Brazil, where it manufactures ingots, wafers, solar cells, solar PV modules, solar power systems, and other solar products.

== Products ==
The firm's standard PV modules are powered 210mm and 182mm N-type TOPCon solar cells that absorb and convert light from both sides of the module. As of 2024, Canadian Solar delivered more than 133 GW of solar PV modules globally, making the firm one of the largest global suppliers of TOPCon solar cell technology.

Since entering the project development business in 2010, Canadian Solar has developed, built, and connected over 10 GWp of solar power projects and 3.3 GWh of battery energy storage projects across the world.

== Awards and recognition ==
Environmental Finance, a U.K.-based sustainability publication, awarded its Global Sustainability Reporting of the Year Award to Canadian Solar for the company's 2023 Corporate Sustainability Report. The company's 2022 Sustainability Report received the Green Project Bond of the Year Award from Environmental Finance for a JPY8.1 billion ($75 million) green project bond for 43 MW solar projects in Ibaraki and Hiroshima, Japan.

== Notable projects ==
=== 2024 ===
United States – Super Bowl LVIII at Allegiant Stadium in Las Vegas, Nevada on February 11, 2024, was powered entirely by renewable energy from the EDF Arrow Canyon solar-plus-storage project on the Moapa Indian Reservation near Las Vegas. The 275-megawatt project uses bifacial panels supplied by Canadian Solar.

South Africa – CSI Solar Co. Ltd., a Canadian Solar subsidiary, supplied 256 megawatts of solar modules for South Africa’s two largest utility-scale solar projects. Developed by SOLA Group in South Africa’s North West Province, the projects are designed to generate 580 gigawatt hours of renewable energy annually, enough to power 40,000 households and reduce carbon emissions by 595,000 tons.

=== 2023 ===
Colombia – Canadian Solar completed Colombia’s first utility-scale battery storage project, a 45-megawatt, 45-megawatt-hour lithium-ion storage system in Barranquilla designed to strengthen the electricity transmission network in northern Colombia. Developed by Colombia's Ministry of Energy and Mines, it was Canadian Solar’s first energy storage project in Latin America.

Brazil – Canadian Solar developed and constructed a 51.1-megawatt-peak solar power project in Minas Gerais, Brazil. The project includes approximately 130,000 Canadian Solar bifacial modules and generates over 107,748 megawatt hours of electricity annually.

=== 2020 ===
Canada – Canadian Solar supplied solar panels and single-axis trackers to the Suffield solar facility in Southeast Alberta, Canada. The 32-megawatt peak, 23-megawatt alternating current plant was the largest solar project in Alberta at the time of its completion in 2020. Electricity from the plant purchased by Direct Energy supports approximately 7,400 households annually.

=== 2019 ===
Argentina – In 2019, the 100-megawatt Cafayate solar plant opened in Salta Province. Developed by Canadian Solar, it was the largest solar power plant in Argentina at the time of its completion. Powered by more than 289,000 Canadian Solar high-efficiency modules, the plant generates more than 216 gigawatt-hours of electricity per year.

=== 2018 ===
Brazil – Canadian Solar developed and constructed 5 solar projects totaling 185 megawatts in Pirapora in the state of Minas Gerais.

=== 2017 ===
Brazil – Canadian Solar supplied modules for the 191.5 MWp Pirappora solar energy project from its 360 MWp modules factory established in Brazil to support the local market.

=== 2016 ===
Texas – Recurrent Energy, a Canadian Solar subsidiary, partnered with Southern Power to develop the 157.5-megawatt Roserock Solar project in Pecos County, Texas.

California – The 100-megawatt Mustang solar power project in Kings County, California reached commercial operation in 2016. Developed by Recurrent Energy, a Canadian Solar subsidiary, the project feeds power to the grid under two long-term contracts.

=== 2015 ===
Turkey – Canadian Solar supplied 27,000 solar modules for a 7.5-megawatt solar project in Turkey’s Kayseri Organized Industrial Zone. It was the country’s largest PV installation at the time of its completion. The project supported Turkey’s energy infrastructure overhaul and its goal of reaching 5 gigawatts of solar capacity by 2023.

Canada – The 100-megawatt, utility-scale Grand Renewable Solar Project in Ontario, which includes 445,000 solar modules from Canadian Solar, was the largest operational solar farm in Canada at the time of its construction.

=== 2014 ===
Honduras – Canadian Solar Inc. supplied 146.4 megawatts of solar modules to two utility-scale solar projects in Honduras. The plants were developed by Solar Power S.A. de C.V. and Compania Hondurena de Energia Solar S.A. de C.V.

United States –The 5.86 MWp Lancaster Solar Project, located 50 miles northwest of Boston, Massachusetts, consists of 19,000 Canadian Solar modules. Developed by EDF Renewable Energy and Urban Green Technologies LLC, the project supplies energy to the town of Billerica, Massachusetts.

=== 2013 ===
Denmark – Canadian Solar supplied 2,800 photovoltaic solar modules for a rooftop solar installation located north of Copenhagen in the Danish city of Virum. With a 605-kilowatt capacity, it was the largest rooftop solar installation in Denmark when it connected to the grid in 2013. The project was built by SRU Solar AG in collaboration with Danish energy company Greengo Energy.

=== 2011 ===
Italy – Canadian Solar supplied modules for the 70-megawatt Rovigo solar power plant in Northeast Italy. Constructed by SunEdison, it was the largest solar power plant in Europe at the time, generating enough energy to power more than 16,500 homes annually while reducing carbon emissions by over 40,000 tons per year.

Germany – Solarpark Senftenberg/Schipkau, a 166-megawatt solar power station in southern Brandenburg, was Germany's largest solar park at the time of its construction in 2011. It uses approximately 636,000 solar panels supplied by Canadian Solar. The solar park was named 2012 Solar Project of the Year Award by POWER-GEN International.

=== 2010 ===
Germany – Canadian Solar and Green City Energy jointly completed a 1-megawatt solar installation in Haertensdorf, Germany.

== See also ==
- List of renewable energy companies by country
