= Trina Solar =

Chinese photovoltaics company

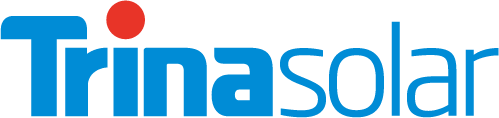
- Native name: 天合光能股份有限公司
- Type: Public
- Traded as: SSE: 688599
- ISIN: CNE100003ZR0
- Industry: Photovoltaics
- Founded: 1997
- Headquarters: Changzhou, China
- Key people: Jifan Gao (CEO)
- Revenue: US$11.272 billion (2024)
- Number of employees: 30,000+ (2023)
- Website: www.trinasolar.com

Trina Solar Co., Ltd., stylized as Trinasolar, is a Chinese photovoltaics company founded in 1997.

== History ==
The company was founded in 1997 by Jifan Gao. In June 2020, Trinasolar listed on the STAR Market of Shanghai Stock Exchange.

A 2023 report by Sheffield Hallam University stated that Trinasolar had very high exposure to production in Xinjiang involving forced Uyghur labor. In August 2023, the U.S. Department of Commerce ruled that Trinasolar circumvented tariffs on Chinese-made goods.

In November 2024, Trinasolar sold its plant in Texas to T1 Energy a week after it opened amid government scrutiny of Chinese companies that benefited from the Inflation Reduction Act. In June 2026, the US Department of Defense added the company to a list of Chinese military-linked companies.
