= Qcells =

Photovoltaic cell manufacturer

- Industry: Photovoltaics
- Headquarters: 86, Cheonggyecheon-ro, Jung-gu, Seoul, South Korea
- Area served: Worldwide
- Key people: Andy Park (SeungDeok Park) (CEO)
- Products: Photovoltaic cells; Solar modules; Photovoltaic systems; Large-scale solar power plants
- Parent: Hanwha Solutions
- Website: Official website in English; Official website in Korean

Qcells (formerly known as Hanwha Qcells) is a manufacturer of photovoltaic cells. The company is headquartered in Seoul, South Korea, after being founded in 1999 in Bitterfeld-Wolfen, Germany, where the company still has its engineering offices. Qcells was purchased out of bankruptcy in August 2012 by the Hanwha Group, a South Korean business conglomerate. Qcells now operates as a subsidiary of Hanwha Solutions, the group's energy and petrochemical company.

Qcells has manufacturing facilities in the United States, Malaysia, and South Korea. The company was the sixth-largest producer of solar cells in 2019, with shipments totaling 7.3 gigawatts.

== History ==
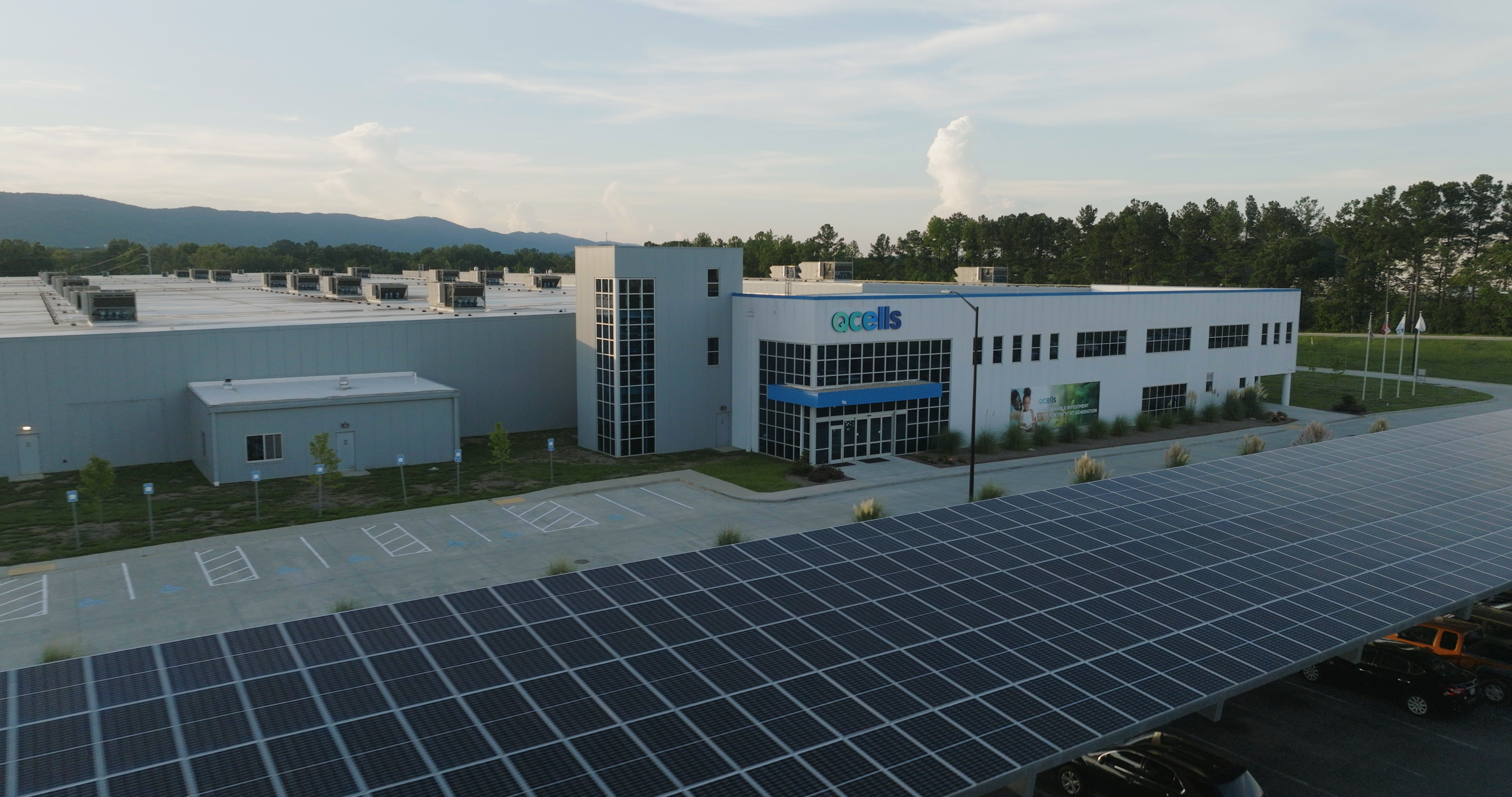
Qcells manufacturing plant in Dalton, Georgia, United States

- Qcells
- Hangul: 한화큐셀
- Revised Romanization: Hanhwa Kyusel
- McCune–Reischauer: Hanhwa K'yusel

On 23 July 2001, the company produced its first working polycrystalline solar cell on its new production line in Thalheim, Germany. Qcells would grow to become one of the world's largest solar cell manufacturers, employing over 2,000 people and encouraging other companies to open facilities in the surrounding area, which would come to be known as Germany's "Solar Valley".

The company went public on 5 October 2005, listing on the Frankfurt Stock Exchange. High share prices during the initial public offering poured money into the company and made the founders wealthy. Lemoine died in 2006, and shortly thereafter, Fest and Grunow left the company to go back into research. Only Milner remained and served as the company's CEO.

In 2005, Qcells established the CdTe PV manufacturer Calyxo. In November 2007, Qcells agreed a deal with Solar Fields, which intellectual property and assets were merged into Calyxo's newly established subsidiary Calyxo USA. In 2011, Solar Fields took over Calyxo.

In 2008, Qcells acquired 17.9% stake in Renewable Energy Corporation. This stake was sold in 2009. At the same year, Qcells' subsidiary Sontor merged with a thin-film company Sunfilm.

In June 2009, the company acquired Solibro, a joint venture it had established in 2006. Solibro manufactured thin-film solar cells based on copper-indium-gallium-diselenide. These modules were marketed until the sale of Solibro to Hanergy in 2012.

Qcells was hit hard by the Great Recession in late 2008, with share prices slipping from over 80 euros to under 20. In response, the company laid off 500 employees. Milner resigned as CEO in early 2010, and by the end of the year, the company's finances appeared to stabilize. Just a few months later, in 2011, the global solar cell market crashed, with production overcapacity driving prices extremely low. Qcells saw sales slide by around 1 billion euros, ran a loss of 846 million euros and on 3 April 2011, the company filed for bankruptcy.

In August 2012, the Hanwha Group, a large South Korean business conglomerate, agreed to acquire Qcells, saying that it presented synergy opportunities. In 2010, Hanwha had purchased a 49.99% share in Chinese manufacturer Solarfun which had been renamed Hanwha SolarOne. SolarOne had been producing solar cells for Qcells under contract. Due to high costs, production in Germany ceased in 2015, with Hanwha moving the work to its SolarOne facilities in China and newly opened manufacturing facilities in Malaysia and South Korea. In 2019, Qcells opened its first manufacturing facility in the United States.

In recent years, Hanwha has since worked to simplify the structure of units, merging SolarOne into Qcells in December 2014, merging Qcells and the company's Advanced Materials (petrochemicals) group in 2018, Qcells & Advanced Materials acquired a solar company operated by the Hanwha Chemicals group in 2019, and in 2020 Hanwha Qcells & Advanced Materials merged with Hanwha Chemical to form the Hanwha Solutions group. In 2022, Hanwha Solutions spun off Qcells’ utility-scale solar park business and merged it with a French wind farm developer to form the new European green energy developer Q ENERGY.

In January 2023, Qcells made a commitment to invest more than $2.5 billion to build a fully integrated, silicon-based solar supply chain in the United States from raw material to finished module with full production expected by the end of 2024. In August 2024, Qcells received a conditional commitment for a future $1.45 billion loan from the US department of energy to help finance the construction of a fully integrated solar cell manufuacturing facility north of Atlanta, Georgia. The loan guarantee was approved in part by Qcells receiving an order from Microsoft for 12 gigawatts of solar panels through 2032 thus demonstrating a market for their product. The loan was finalized in December 2024.

In August 2023, the U.S. Department of Commerce ruled that Qcells had not circumvented tariffs on Chinese-made goods following an investigation involving multiple photovoltaic cell manufacturers.

In July 2024, it was reported that Hanwha Qcells' factory in Dalton, Georgia, was importing cells made with Chinese wafers from TCL Zhonghuan Renewable Energy Technology Co. and Gokin Solar Co., wafer suppliers who source Xinjiang, China polysilicon from Daqo and GCL, both of which are on the UFLPA Entity List. However, the report had stated that there is no evidence that components containing the banned polysilicon have turned up in Qcells panels.

Large manufacturers have their own separate duty rates. In April, 2025, the US Department of Commerce (DOC) has issued anti-dumping and anti-subsidy tariffs against solar cell imports from Thailand, Vietnam, Malaysia and Cambodia. Commerce applied final AD rates of up to 125.37% and anti-subsidy (CVD) rates of up to 3,403.96% to solar cells imported from Cambodia; up to 81.24% AD and up to 168.8% CVD rates to Malaysian products; up to 202.9% AD and up to 799.55% CVD to Thailand; and up to 271.28% AD and up to 542.64% CVD to Vietnam. The lowest CVD rate was applied to Qcells in Malaysia (14.64%), where it also received a 0% AD margin.

== 2024-2025 Hanwha Group and REC Silicon ==
In late 2024, REC Silicon, a major polysilicon supplier in which Hanwha Solutions (the parent of Qcells) is the majority shareholder, ceased operations at its Moses Lake, Washington, facility. The shutdown followed Hanwha Qcells’ termination of a long-term supply agreement, citing a failed product qualification test. Hanwha Solutions, recognizing its responsibility as REC Silicon’s largest shareholder amid the company’s deep financial distress and strategic challenges, has decided to launch a voluntary tender offer to acquire all shares and delist REC from the Oslo Stock Exchange. Most recently, Hanwha Group and REC Silicon have reached a USD 6.5 million short-term loan agreement - the former funding the latter's urgent operational capital needs.

== Operations ==
Qcells develops and produces monocrystaline silicon photovoltaic cells and solar panels. It produces and installs PV systems for commercial, industrial, and residential applications and provides EPC services for large-scale solar power plants.

The company's engineering offices are located at the original headquarters in Thalheim, Germany. Production facilities are located in Dalton, Georgia, and Cartersville, Georgia, in the United States; Cyberjaya in Malaysia; and Jincheon in South Korea.

== See also ==
- List of photovoltaics companies
- Photovoltaic array
- Photovoltaics
- Theory of solar cells
- Thin-film cell
