= List of renewable energy companies by country =

Renewable energy companies by country

The following is a list of renewable energy companies by country. It includes renewable energy companies involved in the development, generation, manufacturing, or supply of renewable energy, including solar power, wind power, hydroelectricity, geothermal energy, bioenergy, and marine energy.

== Australia ==
=== Solar ===
- Dyesol

=== Wind ===
- CWP Renewables
- Goldwind Australia
- Tilt Renewables
- WestWind Energy

=== Hydroelectric ===
- Hydro Tasmania

=== Other renewable energy ===
- Bright Energy Investments
- Genex Power
- Iberdrola Australia
- Ocean Power Technologies Australasia
- Pacific Blue

== Austria ==
=== Hydroelectric ===
- Verbund

== Belgium ==
=== Wind ===
- Wase Wind

=== Other renewable energy ===
- Ecopower

== Canada ==
=== Solar ===
- Canadian Solar
- Morgan Solar

=== Wind ===
- Cartier Wind Energy
- Raum Energy Inc.

=== Hydroelectric ===
- Alterra Power
- BC Hydro
- Canadian Hydro Developers
- Churchill Falls (Labrador) Corporation Limited
- Columbia Power Corporation
- Hydro-Québec
- Innergex Renewable Energy
- Manitoba Hydro
- Newfoundland and Labrador Hydro
- Toba Montrose General Partnership

=== Geothermal ===
- Eavor Technologies

=== Bioenergy ===
- Enerkem
- Himark BioGas
- Iogen Corporation

=== Other renewable energy ===
- Boralex
- Brookfield Renewable Partners
- Bullfrog Power
- Northland Power

== China ==
=== Solar ===
- APsystems
- Daqo New Energy
- Flat Glass Group
- Fox Ess
- Hanergy
- JA Solar Holdings
- JinkoSolar
- LONGi
- Sungrow
- Suntech Power
- Tongwei Company
- Topray Solar
- Trina Solar
- Xinyi Solar
- Yingli
- Zonergy

=== Wind ===
- China Wind
- Concord New Energy
- Envision Energy
- Goldwind
- Huaneng Renewables
- Longyuan Power
- Mingyang Wind Power
- Sinovel
- Titan Wind Energy

=== Hydroelectric ===
- China Yangtze Power

=== Other renewable energy ===
- China Three Gorges Corporation
- China Yajiang Group
- GCL-Poly
- Puxin Biogas
- Sunshine Kaidi

== Denmark ==
=== Wind ===
- Vestas

=== Other renewable energy ===
- Ørsted

== Finland ==
=== Wind ===
- WinWinD

== France ==
=== Solar ===
- Solairedirect
- Solar Euromed

=== Wind ===
- Vergnet

=== Hydroelectric ===
- Compagnie Nationale du Rhône
- Électricité de France

=== Other renewable energy ===
- EDF Renewables
- Enercoop
- Fonroche Énergie
- Global Bioenergies
- Neoen
- Sabella

== Germany ==
=== Solar ===
- Centrosolar
- Concentrix Solar
- Conergy
- Gehrlicher Solar
- IBC Solar
- Mage Solar
- Novatec Solar
- Odersun
- Phoenix Solar
- Roth & Rau
- Schott Solar
- SMA Solar Technology
- Solar Millennium
- SolarWorld
- Solarwatt
- Solon SE
- Soventix GmbH
- Wagner & Co Solar Technology
- Wirsol

=== Wind ===
- ABO Energy
- Enercon
- Energiekontor
- Nordex
- PNE AG
- Prokon
- Senvion
- Skyborn Renewables
- Volkswind

=== Hydroelectric ===
- Schluchseewerk

=== Other renewable energy ===
- Bmp greengas
- Encavis
- Green Planet Energy
- Sonnen GmbH

== Greece ==
=== Solar ===
- HelioSphera

=== Other renewable energy ===
- Terna Energy

== Iceland ==
=== Geothermal ===
- Geysir Green Energy
- HS Orka
- ON Power
- Reykjavik Geothermal

=== Hydroelectric ===
- Landsvirkjun

=== Other renewable energy ===
- Carbon Recycling International
- Icelandic New Energy

== India ==
=== Solar ===
- Astonfield
- Azure Power
- Hindustan Power
- Indosolar
- Mahindra Susten
- Saatvik Green Energy
- SELCO India
- Servotech
- Su-Kam Power Systems
- Tata Power Solar
- Vikram Solar

=== Wind ===
- RRB Energy Limited
- Suzlon
- World Wind

=== Other renewable energy ===
- Adani Green Energy
- Gram Power
- Indian Renewable Energy Development Agency
- OMC Power
- Orb Energy
- Punjab Renewable Energy Systems
- ReNew Energy Global
- Sembcorp Energy India
- Sterling & Wilson
- Welspun Energy

== Ireland ==
=== Other renewable energy ===
- NTR plc

== Israel ==
=== Solar ===
- Arava Power Company
- GreenSun Energy
- SolarEdge
- Solel

== Italy ==
=== Solar ===
- 3Sun

=== Wind ===
- Enessere

=== Other renewable energy ===
- Enel Green Power
- ERG
- Renantis

== Japan ==
=== Solar ===
- Ichigo Inc.
- Sharp Solar
- Solar Frontier

=== Wind ===
- Eurus Energy

=== Other renewable energy ===
- Eco Marine Power

== Kenya ==
=== Solar ===
- M-Kopa

=== Geothermal ===
- Geothermal Development Company

=== Other renewable energy ===
- Kenya Electricity Generating Company

== Mexico ==
=== Bioenergy ===
- BioFields

== New Zealand ==
=== Solar ===
- Lodestone Energy

=== Wind ===
- Windflow Technology

=== Geothermal ===
- Contact Energy
- Eastland Generation
- Mercury Energy
- Top Energy

=== Hydroelectric ===
- Manawa Energy
- Meridian Energy
- Pioneer Energy (NZ)

=== Other renewable energy ===
- Ecotricity (New Zealand)

== Norway ==
=== Solar ===
- Renewable Energy Corporation

=== Hydroelectric ===
- Statkraft

=== Other renewable energy ===
- Scatec

== Philippines ==
=== Solar ===
- San Carlos Solar Energy
- Solar Philippines

== Russia ==
=== Wind ===
- NovaWind

=== Hydroelectric ===
- RusHydro

== Slovakia ==
=== Geothermal ===
- GA Drilling

== South Africa ==
=== Solar ===
- SOLA Group

=== Other renewable energy ===
- Anthem
- Mulilo

== South Korea ==
=== Solar ===
- Hanwha Q CELLS
- SolarPark Korea

=== Wind ===
- SK Oceanplant
- UNISON

== Spain ==
=== Solar ===
- Torresol Energy

=== Wind ===
- Siemens Gamesa Renewable Energy

=== Other renewable energy ===
- Acciona
- Bio Fuel Systems
- EDP Renováveis
- Grenergy
- Iberdrola Renovables

== Sweden ==
=== Marine energy ===
- CorPower Ocean
- Minesto

== Switzerland ==
=== Solar ===
- Meyer Burger

== Taiwan ==
=== Solar ===
- Motech Solar
- Neo Solar Power

=== Wind ===
- Hi-VAWT

== Uganda ==
=== Hydroelectric ===
- Bujagali Energy Limited

== United Arab Emirates ==
=== Solar ===
- Enviromena Power Systems

=== Other renewable energy ===
- Masdar

== United Kingdom ==
=== Solar ===
- Gridserve
- Oxford Photovoltaics
- PV Crystalox Solar
- Solarplicity

=== Wind ===
- Banks Group
- Baywind Energy Co-operative
- Ecotricity
- Energy4All
- Good Energy
- Greencoat UK Wind
- REG WindPower
- Renewable Energy Systems
- Westmill Wind Farm Co-operative

=== Other renewable energy ===
- 100Green
- Ampeak Energy
- Aquamarine Power
- Celtic Renewables
- Hafren Power
- Marine Current Turbines
- Nova Innovation
- Octopus Energy
- Star Energy
- Wavegen

== United States ==
=== Solar ===
- Alta Devices
- Ascent Solar
- Avantus
- CleanChoice Energy
- Cool Earth Solar
- D3Energy
- EIQ Energy
- Enphase Energy
- First Solar
- GoodLeap
- HelioPower
- Miasolé
- Nevados
- Nextpower
- NovaSource Power Services
- NuWatt Energy
- OnForce Solar
- Original Clean Energy
- PowerFilm
- RevoluSun
- Semper Solaris
- Solar Electric Power Company
- Solaren
- Sollega
- Spectrolab
- Stratosolar
- SunCore Corporation
- Sundog Solar
- Suniva
- SunLight General Capital
- SunPower
- Sunrun
- Tesla Energy
- Ubiquitous Energy
- Unirac

=== Wind ===
- Clipper Windpower
- Constellation Energy
- EDP Renewables North America
- Invenergy
- Jacobs Wind
- Mass Megawatts Wind Power
- Native Wind
- NextEra Energy Resources
- Ørsted US Offshore Wind
- Pattern Energy
- US Wind

=== Hydroelectric ===
- Idaho Power
- New York Power Authority
- Tennessee Valley Authority

=== Geothermal ===
- AltaRock Energy
- Fervo Energy
- Ormat Technologies
- Quaise

=== Bioenergy ===
- Gevo
- Green Plains
- POET
- Viaspace

=== Marine energy ===
- CalWave Power Technologies
- Ocean Power Technologies
- Ocean Renewable Power Company
- Verdant Power

=== Other renewable energy ===
- Green Mountain Energy
- RPD Energy
- Sierra Energy
- UGE International
- XPLR Infrastructure

== See also ==
- List of countries by renewable electricity production
- List of energy cooperatives
- List of photovoltaics companies
- List of companies in the nuclear sector
- List of nuclear fusion companies
- List of wind turbine manufacturers
- Outline of nuclear power
- Outline of solar energy
- Outline of wind energy
- Renewable energy industry
- Renewable energy commercialization
