= Puxin (disambiguation) =

Puxin is a rural township in Changhua County, Taiwan.

Puxin may also refer to:

- Puxin Biogas, product of Shenzhen Puxin Science & Technology Co. Ltd. based in Shenzhen, China
- Puxin Community (普新社区), Taihe, Linshui County, Sichuan, China
- Puxin railway station, a railway station on the Taiwan Railways Administration West Coast line
- Puxin Village (埔新里), Shenkeng District, New Taipei, Taiwan
