= EIQ =

EIQ may refer to:

- Ei-Q (1911–1960), Japanese artist
- EIQ Energy, an American solar energy company
- Emotional intelligence quotient
