= Dreisamstadion =

Football stadium in Freiburg, Germany

Coordinates: 47°59′20″N 7°53′35″E

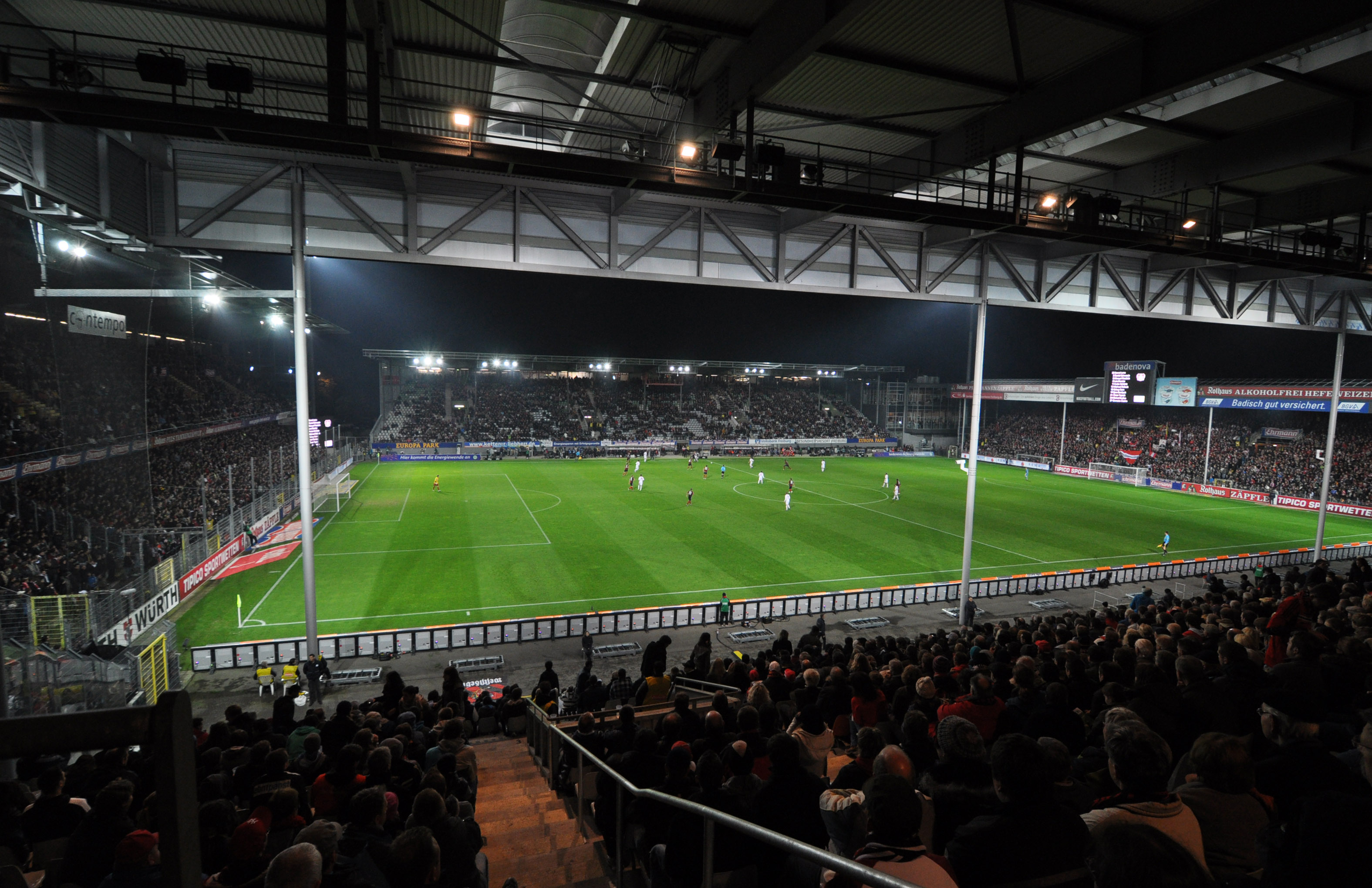
- Interactive map of Dreisamstadion
- Former names: badenova-Stadion (2004–2011); MAGE SOLAR-Stadion (2011–2014); Schwarzwald-Stadion (2014–2021)
- Location: Freiburg, Germany
- Owner: City of Freiburg
- Operator: SC Freiburg (women), SC Freiburg U23
- Capacity: 24,000 (League Matches), 18,000 (International Matches)
- Surface: Grass

Construction
- Opened: 1954
- Renovated: 1970, 1980, 1993–1995, 1999, 2004

Tenants
- SC Freiburg (1954–2021); SC Freiburg II (2021–present); SC Freiburg (women) (2021–present); Germany national football team (selected matches)

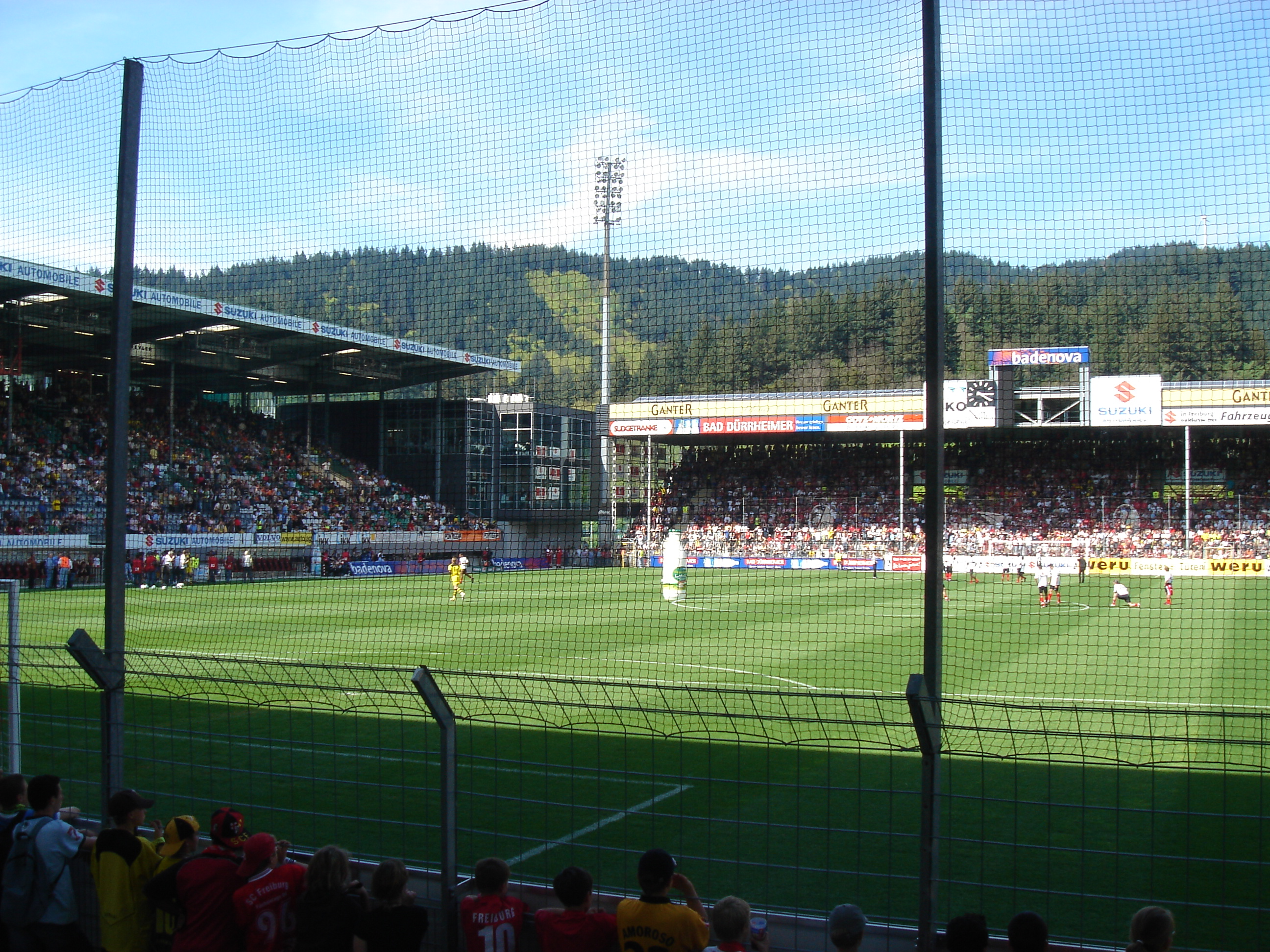
View to the northwest

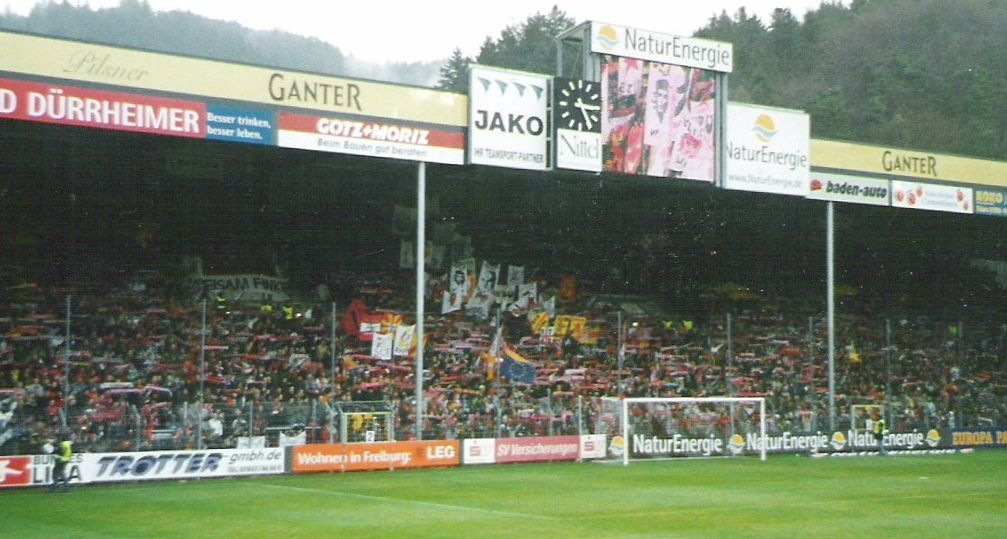
North-side stands

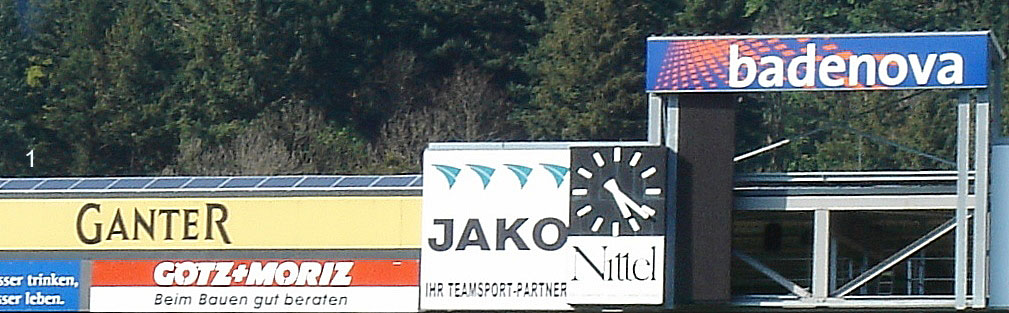
Solar panels on the roof of the stadium

Dreisamstadion is a football stadium in Freiburg, Baden-Württemberg, Germany. It was formerly the home of Bundesliga team SC Freiburg between 1954 and 2021, until a new stadium — the Europa-Park Stadion — was built in October 2021. The stadium holds 24,000 spectators and was built in 1953. It is situated near the Dreisam river, for which it is named.

In June 2004 it was given the name of Badenova-Stadion, later Mage Solar Stadion, and for a short time the Stadion an der Schwarzwaldstraße. Due to a sponsorship deal, it was most recently named the Schwarzwald-Stadion.

In 2012, modernising the stadium was deemed unprofitable. In February 2015, a referendum was held to determine whether a new stadium should be built and if so, where. The citizens of Freiburg voted in favour of the construction of a new stadium with a capacity of 34,700 at the Wolfswinkel nearby Freiburg's municipal airport. The move to the new stadium occurred in the 2021–22 season.

== History ==
The earliest home stadium of SC Freiburg was the Winterer-Stadion, which was first used in 1928. In 1936 the club had to leave the stadium because the Luftwaffe needed it for use as an airstrip. After the end of World War II SC Freiburg didn't have their own home ground and had to use the facilities of Freiburger Turnerschaft von 1844. In 1953, the club received a site east of the city. The sports field was officially opened on 1 September 1954.

In 1970, stands on the south side of the field were constructed, adding 480 covered seats. Following the club's 1978 promotion to the 2. Bundesliga, the first major expansion was planned. The construction of a main stand, which added 1.800 seats, and the expansion of the standing section in 1980 increased the stadium's capacity to 15,000.

In 1993, Rolf Disch's solar architecture firm and coach Volker Finke created the initiative to change their field into a solar stadium. Photovoltaic panels were installed on the roof, creating the first solar powered stadium. The stadium was eventually outfitted with floodlights after Freiburg was promoted to the 1. Bundesliga. The stands to the east of the pitch received a roof and 1,580 new seats. The number of seats in main stands was increased to 5,000. During the 1994/95 winter break construction of stands behind the goal on the south side began, and after the new stands were completed in July 1995, the total capacity was raised to 18,000.

The current size of the stadium was reached in 1999, when the north and south stands were expanded or renovated, respectively. The stands to the north of the pitch offer a standing area for 6,000 spectators, and the stands to the east offer 7,000 seats. Both stands are covered. Space for handicapped spectators were built in front of the east stands, right next to the pitch.

The stadium can fit 24,000 spectators into 14,000 seats and standing areas for 10,000 spectators. All of the stands are covered. Due to a complaint from the neighborhood, the club has been banned from further increases to the stadium's capacity.

The stadium no longer fulfills the UEFA-guidelines (the field is 4,5 meters too short), which means that UEFA European competition matches beyond the qualification phase require special authorization. The DFL gave the SC Freiburg special authorization for the 2012-13 Bundesliga season in the 1. Bundesliga.

In 2004, the stadium's name was changed from Dreisamstadion to Badenova-Stadion, because the trademark rights were given to the energy company Badenova.

By 2004, further construction had been completed. Two photovoltaic-generators cover a large amount of the stadium's energy needs by producing 250,000 kilowatt-hours per year. The pitch-heating is also environmentally friendly. It is powered by Stirling engine. The VIP-guests received an upgrade to their seats in the form of a function building. This building is located in the north-western corner of the stadium. A fan-house was constructed behind the stands on the north side of the pitch. This building is administered by the governing body of the SC Freiburg's fanbase.

Multiple international matches have taken place in the Schwarzwald-Stadion. The most recent game was a friendly match between the Germany National Football Team and the Luxembourg national football team, shortly before the 2006 Football World Cup. During the World Cup the stadium was used as a training ground for the Netherlands national football team, which was quartered in Hinterzarten for the duration. The Germany national under-21 football team has played three times at the stadium.

On February 28, 2008, the Germany women's national football team played a friendly match against the China women's national football team. 20,000 spectators came to watch the Germany team win 2:0. In May 2010, the Dutch National Soccer Team returned to Freiburg and played a test match against the Mexico national football team as part of the preparations for the World Cup.

From the beginning of 2012 until the middle of 2014, the stadium was called the Mage Solar Stadion.

On September 25, 2014, it was announced that the Schwarzwald Tourismus GmbH and seven other financing partners (Freiburg Wirtschaft Touristik und Messe GmbH & Co. KG, Hochschwarzwald Tourismus GmbH (HTG), Liftverbund Feldberg, Hermann Wein Schwarzwälder Genuss Manufaktur, Julabo Labortechnik, Schleith-Gruppe, and AHP Merkle) had taken over the trademark rights of the stadium for five years. They also decided to change the name of the stadium to Schwarzwald-Stadion. The name change was ratified by the Freiburg municipal council on October 7, 2014.

The name of the stadium was reverted to Dreisamstadion after the 2020–21 season, coinciding with SC Freiburg's scheduled move to the newly built SC-Stadion; however, the move was later delayed to October 2021. Starting with the 2021–22 season, the stadium is being used by SC Freiburg's reserve team as well as their women's team.

SC Freiburg played their 360th and final Bundesliga match at the stadium on 26 September 2021.

The stadium can be reached via the tram line "Stadtbahnlinie 1" or via the Höllentalbahn, which stops at the train-station Freiburg-Littenweiler. The Schwarzwaldstraße and connecting streets between Hansjakobstraße and the Schwarzwaldstraße are closed during home games for all non-residents.

== Stadium newsletter ==
The "SC-Report" was circulated at no cost until the 1995–96 Bundesliga season. Since then the stadium newsletter "Heimspiel"(home game) has existed. After the first ascension into the 1. Bundesliga in 1993, a multitude of Fanzines came out of the Freiburg fan community. The "Fanman" and "Charly" Fanzines are well known even outside of Freiburg. During the 2009–10 Bundesliga season, the Freiburg Ultra-scene released the "Bruddler", a successor of the "Dreisamgeplätscher", which was released by the Wilden Jungs Freiburg. The "Dreisamgeplätscher" was published twice during the 2008-09 Bundesliga season. The "Bruddler" fanzine was discontinued, and the "Dreisamgeplätscher" was published biannually starting in the 2010-11 Bundesliga season. The publishing is done exclusively by the Wilden Jungs Freiburg.

== International matches ==
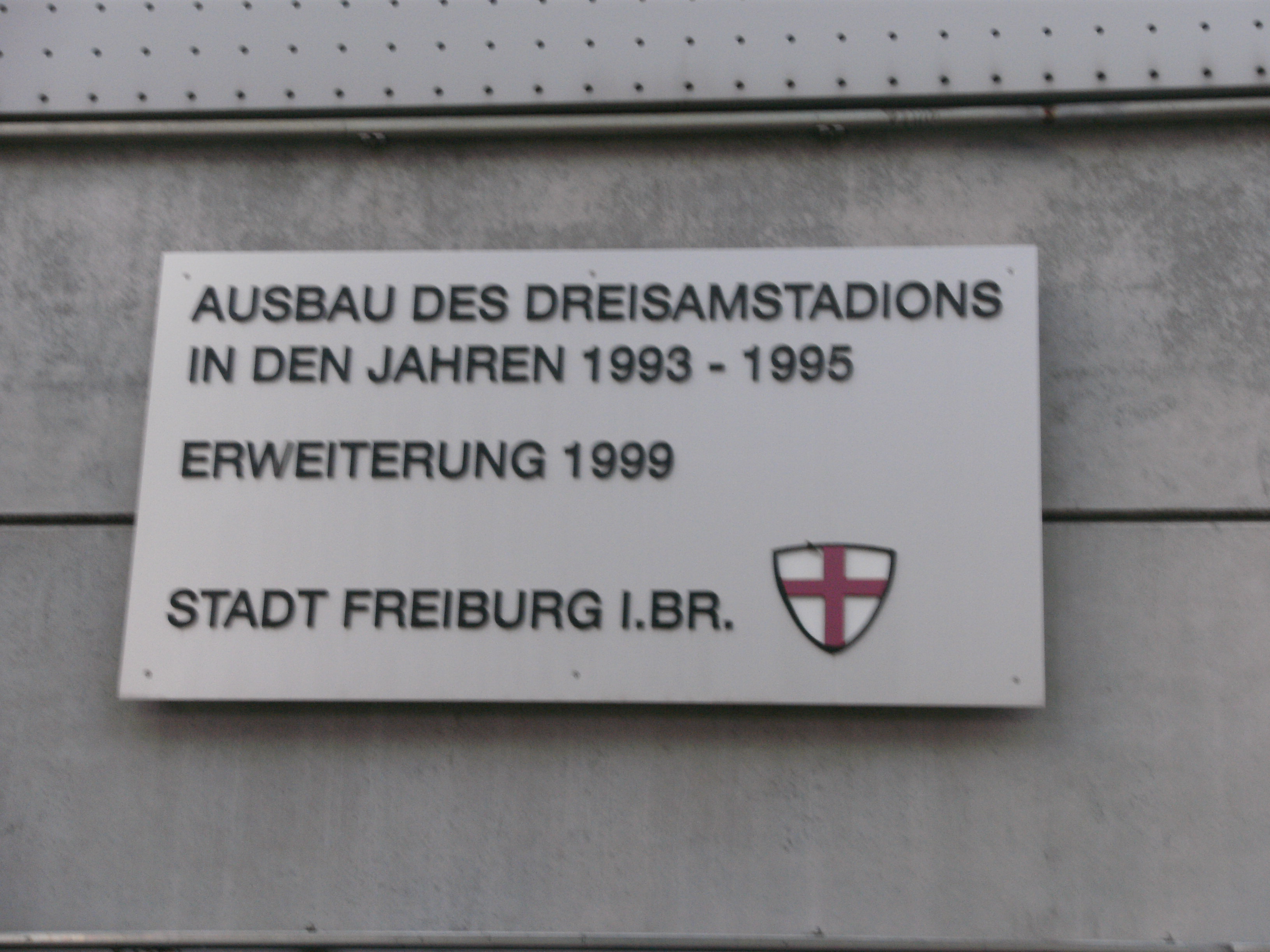
Placard regarding construction on the stadium

=== Men ===
Four international matches of the Germany National Football Team took place in the Schwarzwald-Stadion:

- June 7, 2000: Germany – Liechtenstein 8:2
- May 9, 2002: Germany – Kuwait 7:0
- May 27, 2004: Germany – Malta 7:0
- May 27, 2006: Germany – Luxembourg 7:0

U21-National team:

- August 13, 2013: Germany – France 0:0

The Netherlands National Football Team and the Mexico National Football Team played each other:

- May 26, 2010: Netherlands – Mexico 2:1

=== Women ===
The Women's National Team played once in the Schwarzwald-Stadion:

- February 28, 2008: Germany – China 2:0

== Literature ==
- Werner Skrentny (Hrsg.): Das große Buch der deutschen Fußballstadien. Verlag Die Werkstatt, Göttingen 2001, ISBN 3-89533-306-9, S. 129–131

== See also ==
- SC-Stadion
- Freiburg
