= Westermost Rough =

Westermost Rough may refer to:

- A region of the North Sea
- A wind farm in the North Sea, Westermost Rough wind farm
