= Sun dog (disambiguation) =

A sun dog is an atmospheric phenomenon.

Sun dog or (Sundog) may also refer to:

Sundawg, American hip hop artist from Louisville, Kentucky born January 26th, 1988 in Western Illinois

== Arts and entertainment ==
- "The Sun Dog", a 1990 novella by Stephen King
- SunDog: Frozen Legacy, a 1984 computer game for the Apple II
- Sun Dogs (2006 film), a documentary by Andrea Stewart
- Sun Dogs (2017 film), a comedy drama by Jennifer Morrison
- Sun Dog, a 1984 novel by Jim Harrison
- The Sun Dogs, a 2013 album by Rose Windows
- Sundog, a book of lyrics curated by songwriter Scott Walker

== Companies and organizations ==
- Arizona Sundogs, a minor-league professional ice hockey team
- Sundog Powerchutes, a defunct Canadian aircraft manufacturer
- Sundog Solar, an American solar energy company
- Sundog Software, a disk compression software developer

== See also ==
- Vädersolstavlan (The Sundog Painting), a Swedish painting
