= Rohit Chandra =

Indian entrepreneur (born 1964)

- Born: 9 July 1964 (age 62); Lucknow, Uttar Pradesh, India
- Education: Aligarh Muslim University
- Occupations: CEO and Founder OMC Power
- Organization: OMC Power
- Known for: Solar Energy

Rohit Chandra (born 9 July 1964) is an Indian entrepreneur, CEO and founder of OMC Power.

Rohit was the founding chairman of Indian chapter of Global Mobile Suppliers Association.

== Early life and education ==
Rohit Chandra was born on 9 July 1964 in Lucknow, Uttar Pradesh and raised in Aligarh, Uttar Pradesh. In 1980, he completed his early education from Our Lady of Fatima Senior Secondary School, Aligarh. In 1986, Rohit earned his Engineering degree from Aligarh Muslim University in Electronics & Communication.

== Background and career ==
Rohit Chandra started his career from Philips as a Product Specialist – Data communications. He later joined Forbes & forbes as a marketing manager and subsequently worked at Wandel & Goltermann as Country manager. From 1999 to 2004, he served as Executive Vice President at Ericsson. He then joined Aircel as executive director and chief executive officer, serving from 2004 to 2008. Chandra also worked as Chief Operating Officer at Uninor (Later Telenor India) until 2010.

=== Renewable energy sector ===
After spending 3 decades in telecom industry Rohit Chandra entered into renewable energy sector and founded OMC Power in 2011 along with his partners Sushil Jiwarajka, and Anil Raj with their own funds in Gurgaon, Haryana.

He started distributed energy operations in rural areas of Indian state Uttar Pradesh. Till 2026 It is operational in 400 villages.

Rohit has built and led large operations and maintenance team, overseeing the commissioning of 396 mini-grid power plants across eighteen districts of Uttar Pradesh. These plants have generated an aggregate of 2.3 Megawatt capacity.

In 2025, Chandra entered into a partnership with Honda Motor Co., signing an agreement with Minoru Kato, Chief Officer of Motorcycle and Power Products. Together, they collaborated to develop clean energy battery technologies.

== Awards and recognitions ==
- Most Promising Business Leader in Asia in 2023 by The Economic Times
