= Bmp greengas =

German company

bmp greengas GmbH
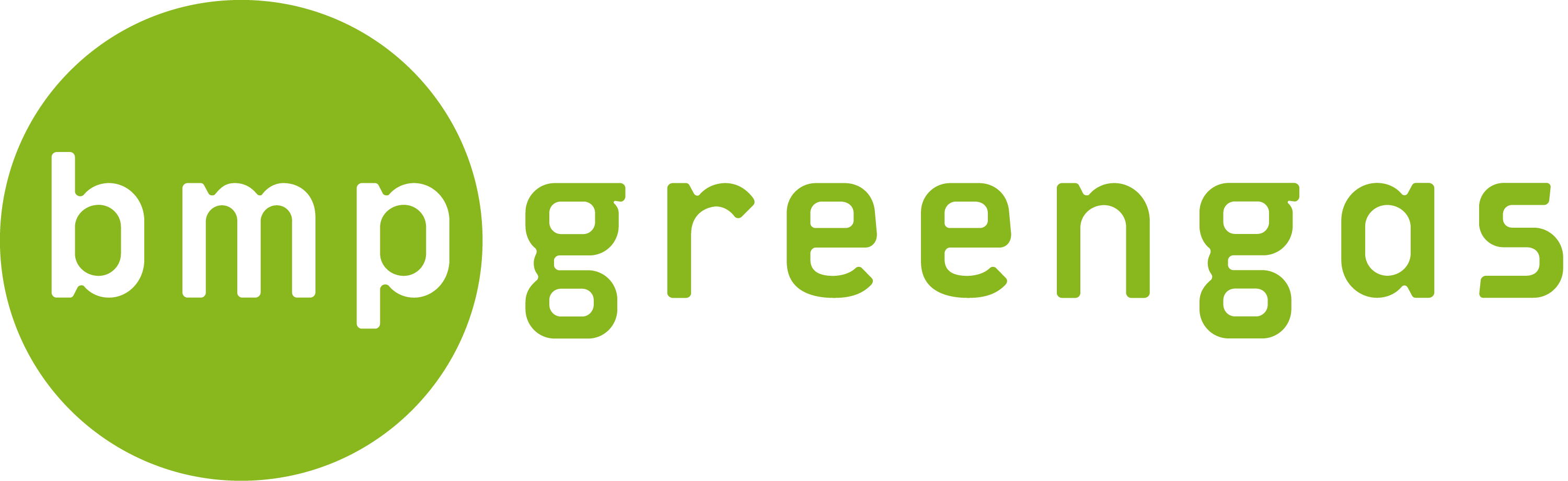
- Industry: Renewable energy
- Founded: 2003
- Headquarters: Munich, Germany
- Key people: Sebastian Gröblinghoff, Managing Director: Stefan Schneider, Managing Director
- Products: Biomethane
- Revenue: over €300 million
- Number of employees: 60
- Website: www.bmp-greengas.com

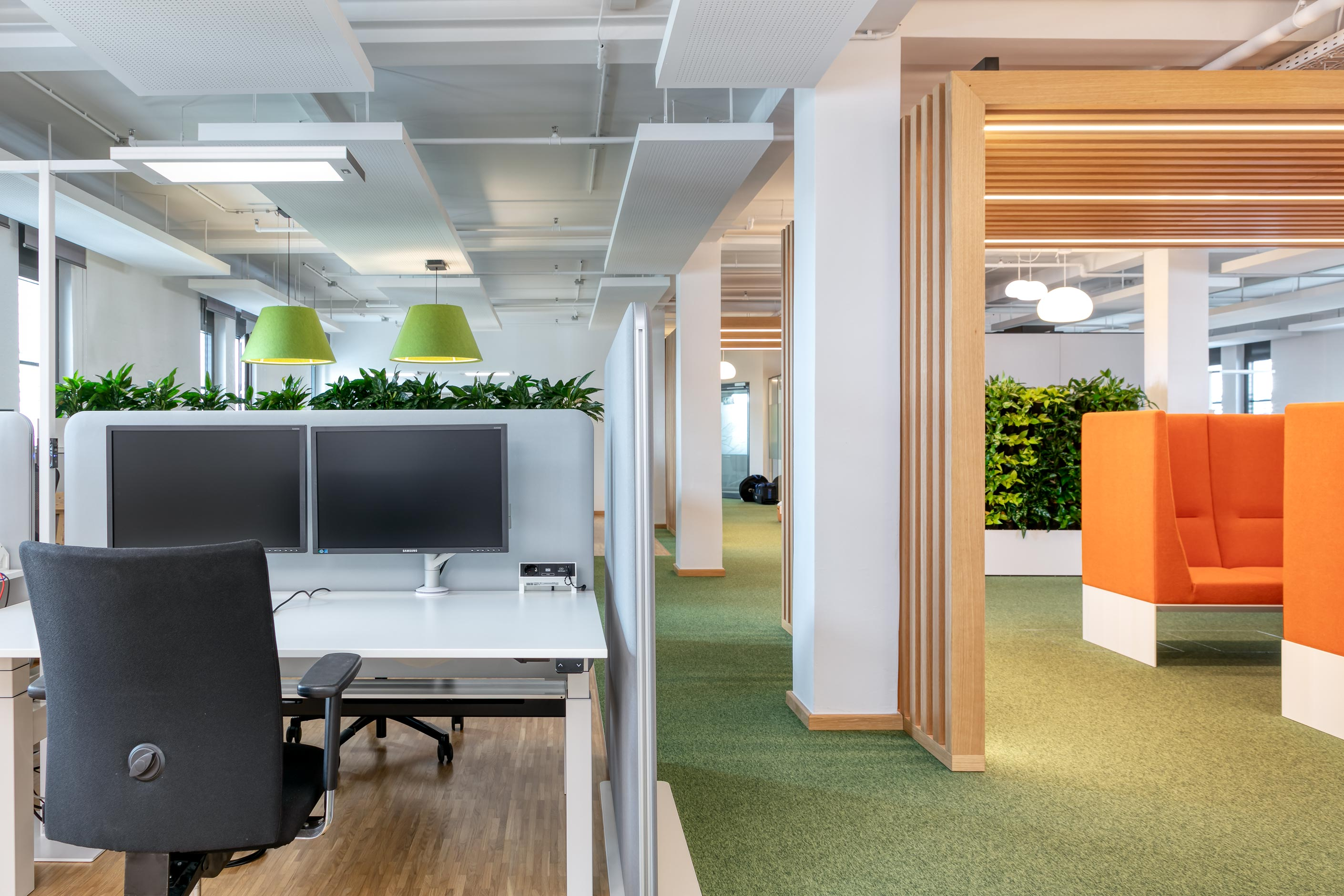
Office in Munich

bmp greengas GmbH is a German company based in Munich, active in biomethane and a trader of biomethane in Europe. As a wholly owned subsidiary of VNG Handel & Vertrieb GmbH, it is part of the EnBW-Group. The company develops energy supply solutions based on biomethane, green hydrogen, bio-SNG, bio-CNG, and bio-LNG.

== Founding and Early Years ==
bmp greengas GmbH was founded in 2003 by Dr. Andreas Seebach and operated under the name RES Renewable Energy Systems GmbH until 2007. The initial goal was to upgrade biogas in partnership with plant operators and inject it into the pipeline. Later, the approach evolved to building and operating its own biomethane plants to purify biogas and feed it into the grid.

After conducting various feasibility studies, Germany’s first biomethane injection plant was implemented in 2005 at the Pliening site (20 km east of Munich). In December 2006, it became the first facility to inject biomethane into the German gas network. In 2007, the business model was restructured and shifted to focus exclusively on gas trading. The previous project development activities were spun off into a new company called RES Projects.

By 2012, company founder Dr. Andreas Seebach had expanded the affiliated companies into a corporate group comprising over 20 entities and holdings. The company's origin tracking system, called Greenbook^{[2]} formed the basis for the biogas registry of the Deutschen Energie-Agentur (dena). Developed in 2009, the registry serves to document all biomethane volumes across each stage of the value chain. The system was introduced in response to the German renewable-energy-law called Erneuerbare-Energien-Gesetzes (EEG) in 2009. Further policy changes in 2013 related to the EEG, as well as debates about limiting electricity prices, prompted a restructuring of the company’s operations.

In 2013, Volker Seebach, brother of company founder Dr. Andreas Seebach, joined bmp greengas GmbH as a managing director and shareholder. The two jointly led the company until early 2014.

In 2015, bmp greengas GmbH reached a trading volume of approximately 1.4 TWh/a in the German biomethane sector. In 2016, the company acquired the biomethane sales business of VNG AG.

As of September 30, 2016, the last production shareholdings of the company—specifically the biomethane plants Klein Wanzleben GmbH and Kroppenstedt GmbH—were sold to MVV Energie AG. These assets previously belonged to bmp greengas GmbH, which has since been renamed. According to the former Managing Director Volker Seebach, this step was part of an internal restructuring at bmp greengas. The goal was to focus entirely on the company’s core business: biomethane trading and system services.

== Acquisition ==
In March 2017, Erdgas Südwest GmbH based in Ettlingen, acquired bmp greengas GmbH as a subsidiary. As a result, bmp greengas GmbH became part of the EnBW Energie Baden-Württemberg AG. Erwin Holl and Matthias Kerner took over the management of bmp greengas GmbH. The former shareholders, Dr. Andreas Seebach and Volker Seebach, continued to support the company in an advisory capacity.

In 2019, bmp greengas GmbH took over the biomethane sales business of BayWa r.e. renewable energy GmbH , expanding its portfolio volume to over 3 TWh/a.

In July 2019, Erwin Holl retired, and Matthias Kerner became the sole managing director. By 2021, bmp greengas GmbH reported a portfolio volume exceeding 4 TWh/a. In January 2022, Matthias Kerner was succeeded by Frank Erben as interim sole managing director.

Since February 1, 2022, Stefan Schneider has joined the management team of bmp greengas GmbH. As of May 1, 2022, Sven Kraus and Stefan Schneider have formed a dual leadership as co-managing directors. On December 31, 2022, interim managing director Frank Erben left the company as planned. In May 2023, a self-administered insolvency procedure was initiated. After the insolvency proceedings concluded on March 14, 2024, bmp greengas GmbH became a 100% subsidiary of VNG Handel & Vertrieb GmbH in the same year, thus remaining part of the EnBW Group.

In July 2025, Sven Kraus left the company at his own request. Since then, Sebastian Gröblinghoff has been managing the company together with Stefan Schneider.

== Insolvency ==
The Local Court in Karlsruhe opened the self-administered insolvency proceedings on 1 August 2023. The insolvency plan based on a takeover offer from EnBW AG was approved by the creditors’ meeting on 12 December 2023. The insolvency proceedings were terminated by the Local Court in Karlsruhe on 14 March 2024. After completing the insolvency proceedings, bmp greengas GmbH became a 100% subsidiary of VNG Handel & Vertrieb GmbH in November 2024.

== Prices and awards ==
In 2009, the company received the first Innovation Award from dena (Deutsche Energie-Agentur) biogaspartner. The award was for the principle of taking volumes directly from biomethane feed-in plants and redistributing them to customers throughout Germany in line with demand. This way, the trading basis for the biomethane product was created..

According to a 2017 study by FOCUS and Statista, bmp greengas was listed among the 14 fastest‑growing companies in the energy and utilities sector. With an average of 44 % growth per year, the company even came 5th in the ranking with other companies with annual sales of more than 100 million.

In 2022 and 2023, bmp greengas received the "Top Company" award from kununu. , which highlights companies ranked within the top five percent of ratings on the platform.
