= Westermost Rough Wind Farm =

Offshore wind farm in the North Sea, England

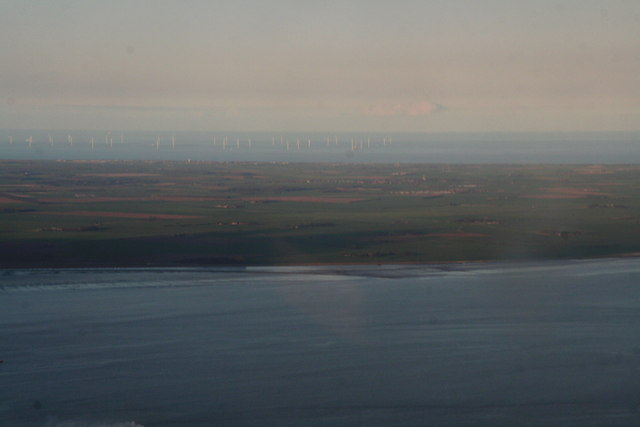
- Westermost Rough visible on the horizon, under construction in March 2015
- Country: United Kingdom
- Location: 8 km (5 mi) north-east of Withernsea, East Riding of Yorkshire
- Coordinates: 53°49′N 0°09′E
- Status: Operational
- Construction began: 2014
- Commission date: May 2015
- Owners: Green Investment Group; Marubeni; Ørsted
- Operator: Ørsted

Wind farm
- Type: Offshore
- Rotor diameter: 154 m (505 ft)
- Site area: 35 km^{2} (14 sq mi)

Power generation
- Units operational: 35 × 6 MW
- Make and model: Siemens Gamesa SWT-6.0-154 (35)
- Nameplate capacity: 210 MW

External links
- Commons: Related media on Commons

Wind farm layout

Westermost Rough Wind Farm is an offshore wind farm 8 kilometres (5 mi) north east of Withernsea off the Holderness coast, in the North Sea, England. The farm covers an area of approximately 35 km^{2} (14 sq mi) with a generation capacity of approximately 210 MW. It became operational in May 2015.

== History ==
The Westermost Wind farm site was originally awarded to Total in 2003 during the initial Round 2 wind farm tendering process; Total later withdrew and the concession was returned to the Crown Estate in 2006. In 2007 DONG Energy was awarded a lease from The Crown Estate to develop a wind farm at Westermost Rough. The company Westermost Rough Ltd was established 2007; (Note: Westernmost Rough Limited, incorporated 1 May 2007, company number 0623914. Source: Companies House database) a subsidiary of DONG Energy.

A planning application was submitted in November 2009, and consent was given by the Department of Energy and Climate Change in 2011 for a development of up to 80 turbines of up to 245 MW power with a limit of 172 m (564 ft) turbine tip height, and 150 m (490 ft) rotor diameter, as well as associated onshore and offshore substations, cabling and other infrastructure.

Initial expectations were for an earliest in service date of 2014, in January 2013 construction of the wind farm was confirmed, with construction scheduled to start in 2014 with the farm operational by 2015.

DONG Energy sold a 50% stake in the wind farm in equal parts to the Green Investment Bank and to Marubeni Corporation for a total of £240 million; as part of the sale the two buyers committed to investing £500 million in the construction of the wind farm; the two companies, through the joint company WMR JV Investco Limited secured £370 million from lenders in August 2014 to fund the capital cost of the project.

=== Design, manufacture and construction ===
The wind farm is located 8 km (5 mi) off the Holderness coast, roughly northeast of Withernsea. (Note: Boundaries of the wind farm are at grid locations 53°50.5754′N 00°09.6150′E, 53°47.9824′N 00°12.7432′E, 53°46.1311′N 00°08.3651′E, 53°48.7222′N 00°05.2348′E, and 53°50.5754′N 00°09.6150′E. (London Gazette, 18 June 2012)) The proposed design is for 35 to 80 turbines of between 3 and 7 MW power output, in an area of 35 km^{2} (14 sq mi), with a total installed capacity of up to 245 MW.

The offshore substation design was subcontracted to Ramboll, with medium voltage turbine to offshore transformer submarine cables supplied by Nexans. High voltage 155 kV submarine export cables and 155/275 kV underground cables were contracted to be supplied from LS Cable & System of Korea. The cable landing point is to be near Tunstall, East Riding of Yorkshire, with a national grid connection made via the buried cables to a new substation at Salt End.

The project was the first commercial use of gearless 6 MW Siemens Wind turbines; 35 turbines were to be installed, giving a capacity of 210 MW. Varde, Denmark based Titan Wind Energy was contracted to supply towers, with tower foundations supplied by Bladt Industries of Aalborg, Denmark. The driven monopile foundations are 6.25 metres (20.5 ft) diameter with mass up to 800 t, with 425 t transition pieces.

A dual Doppler radar system, (originally developed by the US National Wind Institute, and supplied by SmartWind Technologies, LLC.) was used to measure high-density wind details over the large wind farm area, with the experiment supported by the Carbon Trust organisation.

GeoSea was awarded the contract to install foundation piles in April 2013. The first foundation pile was installed in February 2014. In early 2014 residents of Withernsea and the nearby area reported noise and vibration disturbance during the night time, attributed to piling at the wind farm site; by April 2014 an investigation by the Marine Management Organisation had found evidence of noise, but the results were not conclusive enough for it to act on. Foundation installation was completed by May 2014, and the offshore substation installed by June 2014. Turbine installation was completed March 2015.

== Operations ==
The wind farm was commissioned and became operational in May 2015. Its levelised cost has been estimated at £121/MWh.

In May 2015, Ofgem awarded preferred bidder status to own and operate the electrical transmission assets of the wind farm to Transmission Capital Partners; in early 2016 the sale of the assets (TC Westernmost Rough OFTO Ltd.) to a consortium of Transmission Capital Partners Limited Partnership and International Public Partnerships Limited was completed. In early 2016 CWind was given a 20-year contract to maintain the TC Westernmost Rough OFTO's electrical transmission assets.

In 2017, DONG Energy rebranded themselves as Ørsted as the acronym for DONG Energy - Danish Oil & Natural Gas - was seen as inappropriate for a company which had divested its entire oil and gas operations and was building an energy portfolio that was approaching 100% renewable.
