= Morgan Solar =

- Type: Private
- Industry: Solar Power; Sustainable Energy
- Founded: 2007
- Founders: John Paul Morgan; Nicolas Morgan
- Headquarters: Toronto, Ontario, Canada
- Products: BIPV; In Situ IV Curve Tracers; Optical Films
- Number of employees: <30 (2022)
- Website: morgansolar.com

Morgan Solar, Inc. is a Canadian solar power and optical technology company based in Toronto, Ontario. Since 2017, the company has specialized in urban sunlight management, led by its SPOTlight platform. The company also produces in situ IV curve tracers and optical film technologies.

== History ==
Morgan Solar was founded in 2007 by brothers John Paul Morgan and Nicolas Morgan as an optical technology company with the goal of achieving solar power generation at costs rivalling traditional energy sources. Morgan Solar grew to employ over 50 scientists, engineers and business administrators in the GTA as well as a number of manufacturing experts, test site managers and business developers outside of Canada.

In 2010 Asif Ansari, former founder and CEO of eSolar, joined Morgan Solar as Chief Executive Officer. Ansari's corporate portfolio includes leadership positions with eSolar and Suntrough Energy.

Pivot:

In 2016 Mike Andrade, former President of the new products division of Celestica, took over as Chief Executive Officer. Andrade's corporate portfolio includes leadership positions with Celestica as part of the founding management team as well as building Celestica's PV business.

Under Andrade's leadership the company underwent a significant pivot closing both its CPV and Tracker divisions. Beginning in 2017 the company rebranded as a Light Management Solutions Provider. The company's new product portfolio includes its SPOTlight (Simple Planar Optical Technology) platform, it's IV DAQ - an in situ IV curve tracer, and SimbaX an optical film used to optimize the performance of silicon panels.

== Technology ==
=== SPOTlight Platform ===
MSI created a series of Building Integrated Photovoltaics (BIPV) integrated with Simple Planar Optic Technology. SPOTlight product integrate traditional silicon solar cells with performance optimizing optics. The portfolio includes architectural fins, shading slats, pergolas, brise soleils and energy producing window coverings.

=== IV DAQ and Analytic Platform ===
The IV DAQ is an in situ IV curve tracer which captures module performance data as often as once per minute. IV curves from individual IV DAQs are transferred, along with data from reference cells, weather stations and pyranometers, through a wireless gateway to the cloud-based Analytics Portal, where longitudinal data can be compared and analyzed to determine DC-side field health. The in situ tracer represents an improvement over traditional handheld tracers which capture sparse and disparate data points, and which are not easily correlated with other sensors.

=== SimbaX ===
SimbaX Optic Films are a legacy product from MSI's time as an industry leading CPV company. SimbaX optic films are applied to Silicon PV back sheets optimizing performance by maximizing the amount of photons that reach individual PV cells.

== Legacy Technology ==
=== Sun Simba CPV ===
The Sun Simba used a customized "Light-guide Solar Optic" to focus light collected over a large surface area on to a relatively small, highly efficient solar cell for conversion into electricity. Multiple generations of the Sun Simba were developed and deployed at test sites in Ontario and California. The highest reported active area efficiency of the Sun Simba was 29%, as compared to the experimental world record efficiency of 44.7% in 2013.

=== Savanna Dual-Axis Tracker ===
The Savanna PV tracker is designed both to complement the Sun Simba CPV panel, and to be used as an augmentation to improve the output of standard PV solar panels. Solar panels generate the most power when they are directly facing the sun. By using a tracking system to keep panels properly aligned, output power production can be significantly increased. The Savanna distinguishes itself from many other trackers on the market in that it is much easier to install, requiring no heavy equipment or specialized infrastructure to be assembled ahead of time.

== Investors ==
Morgan Solar has raised over US$38 million in investments as of the end of 2011. In addition to monetary investments Morgan Solar has formed strategic partnerships with several companies, including Iberdrola, Enbridge, inc. and Enertech.

== See also ==
- Concentrated solar power
- Concentrated photovoltaics
- List of renewable energy companies by country
- Solar power
