= Raum Energy Inc. =

Former wind turbine manufacturer in Saskatoon, Saskatchewan, Canada

Raum Energy Inc..
- Type: Privately owned
- Founder: Jessie, Darryl
- Headquarters: Saskatoon, Canada
- Products: Wind Turbines
- Website: www.raumenergy.ca

Raum Energy Inc. was a company based in Saskatoon, Saskatchewan, Canada which designed and manufactured small-scale wind turbines, grid-tie inverter and battery charge controller systems. These systems, which could run off of either wind or photovoltaic generated power, were specifically designed for use with residential-scale applications. The company's 1.3 kW turbine was one of the first systems setup for testing at Canada's Wind Energy Institute for to participate in a national study into the reliability and performance of small-scale generator systems.

The company's flagship system combined a 3.5 kW turbine with a grid-tie inverter or battery charge controller and could generate 6,000 kW-hrs of energy annually. This system was set to also begin testing at WEICAN in April 2010.

Raum Energy Inc. was awarded the 2009 Western Canadian National Research Council's award for innovative new technology.

== See also ==
- List of renewable energy companies by country
