= Sharp Solar =

Manufacturer of photovoltaic cells and films

- Industry: Solar Electricity
- Founded: 1959
- Founder: Tokuji Hayakawa
- Headquarters: Osaka, Japan
- Key people: Katsuhiko Machida (Representative Director, Chairman, CEO); Mikio Katayama (Representative Director, President, COO)
- Products: Solar modules (residential, commercial, utility)
- Owner: Sharp Corporation
- Number of employees: 59,100 (as of 10/2009)
- Parent: Sharp Electronics
- Website: global.sharp/solar

Sharp Solar, a subsidiary of Sharp Electronics, is a solar energy products company owned by Sharp Corporation and based in Osaka, Japan.

== Products ==
The company produces thin film modules and mono and poly-crystalline silicon solar cells.

Sharp's photovoltaic (PV) modules are used for many applications, from satellites to lighthouses, and industrial applications to residential use.

Sharp Solar manufactures PV modules in multiple locations, though it shut down solar panel production at its factories in Wrexham, Wales and Memphis, Tennessee in 2014.

== History ==
Sharp began researching solar cells in 1959, with mass production beginning in 1963. Production capacity amounted to 324 MW in 2004. In 2010, they were the #1 producer of PV cells, in terms of revenues.

=== Timeline ===
1959: Started development of solar cells
1963: Began mass production of solar cells
1963: First to supply ocean buoy with solar power cells
1966: Installed solar on lighthouse
1967: Began development of solar space applications
1976: "Ume" satellite successfully launched with solar cells on board
1980: Released first solar calculator
1981: Began operations at Shinjo Plant (now Katsuragi)
1988: Reached 11.5% cell conversion for amorphous silicon solar cells
1992: Reached 17.1% cell conversion for polycrystalline solar cells
1992: Achieved world's highest cell conversion efficiency of 22%
1994: Commercialization of residential solar power system (grid-connected)
2000: Became global leader in solar cell manufacturing
2001: Obtained UL (U.S.) and TUV (EU) certification for PV modules
2002: Developed the industry's first string power conditioner
2003: Space PV module installed on Satellite Observatory "Free Flyer" (SFU)
2003: Began producing PV modules in the United States
2003: Began producing PV modules in Europe
2005: Developed solar cells that admit light and can be used as building materials for windows
2005: Began mass-producing thin film solar cells
2006: Katsuragi plant expands its annual production capacity to 600 megawatts, the world's highest at that time
2007: Expanded production capacity of PV modules to 200 megawatts in Europe
2008: Became first PV manufacturer in the world to achieve cumulative production of 2 GW
2008: Achieved industry's highest conversion efficiency for a polycrystalline PV module of 14.4%
2009: Launched thin film modules globally
2010: Launched world's highest efficiency Solar PV panel with greater than 32.5% efficiency
2010: Investment made into 2.8 GW annual production capacity

== See also ==
- List of photovoltaics companies
- Photovoltaic array
- Photovoltaics
- Solar energy companies
- Sharp Corporation divisions and subsidiaries
