= Ecotricity (New Zealand) =

Ecotricity is New Zealand's carboNZero certified electricity provider.

== History ==
Ecotricity was founded in 2013 by Al and Mark Yates. It is headquartered in Auckland, NZ. Ecotricity is Kiwi and Community owned and has the capacity to supply up to 30,000 household equivalent.

== Awards ==
- Community Innovation
- Mega Efficiency Innovation
