= Fox ESS =

Chinese manufacturer of solar inverters and battery energy storage systems

Fox ESS Co., Ltd.
- Trade name: Fox ESS
- Native name: 麦田能源股份有限公司
- Type: Privately held company
- Industry: Renewable energy equipment
- Founded: 23 September 2019; 7 years ago
- Headquarters: Wenzhou, Zhejiang, China
- Products: Battery energy storage systems, photovoltaic inverters, hybrid inverters, microinverters, electric vehicle chargers, heat pumps and energy-management software
- Website: www.fox-ess.com

Fox ESS Co., Ltd. (Chinese: 麦田能源股份有限公司), trading as Fox ESS, is a Chinese manufacturer of photovoltaic inverters and battery energy storage systems headquartered in Wenzhou, Zhejiang. Founded in 2019, it develops equipment for the conversion, storage and management of electricity, primarily for distributed solar generation and residential and commercial energy storage.

The company's product range includes residential and commercial battery systems, grid-connected, hybrid and microinverters, electric vehicle chargers, heat pumps and energy-management software.

== History ==
Fox ESS was established in September 2019. It launched its first products and began overseas shipments in 2020, and opened its Wenzhou headquarters in 2021.

== Products and operations ==
Fox ESS develops energy-storage systems, grid-connected inverters and related energy-management equipment. Its storage products combine batteries, battery-management systems and inverters for residential and commercial applications. The company also sells electric vehicle chargers and heat pumps, and operates the FoxCloud monitoring platform.

In June 2026, Fox ESS signed separate supply agreements with Australian distributors Solar Juice and OSW covering a combined 10 GWh of battery energy storage products over two years.

== Market position ==
S&P Global Energy's Residential Energy Storage Market Tracker ranked Fox ESS first worldwide among residential energy-storage suppliers for 2025, measured by energy capacity shipped in MWh.

In InfoLink Consulting's worldwide residential energy-storage shipment ranking for the first half of 2026, Fox ESS placed first, followed by Sigenergy, Deye, Huawei and GoodWe. InfoLink stated that the ranking measured shipments primarily on a battery-pack basis and included both standalone battery packs and complete systems.

== Product testing ==
Fox ESS products have been included in independent testing of photovoltaic storage systems. In the 2026 Energy Storage Inspection, the Berlin University of Applied Sciences and Technology and its spin-off aquu assessed 12 residential storage systems in the 5 kW and 10 kW classes. The Fox ESS PQ-H3-Ultra-10.0 hybrid inverter paired with the EQ3300-5 battery achieved a System Performance Index (SPI) of 97%—the highest result among the 10 kW hybrid-inverter systems tested—and recorded standby consumption of 4 W. The SPI measures the overall energy performance of a photovoltaic battery system under standardised operating conditions; it is not the efficiency rating of an individual inverter or battery component.
