= MVV Energie =

German energy supply company

MVV Energie AG

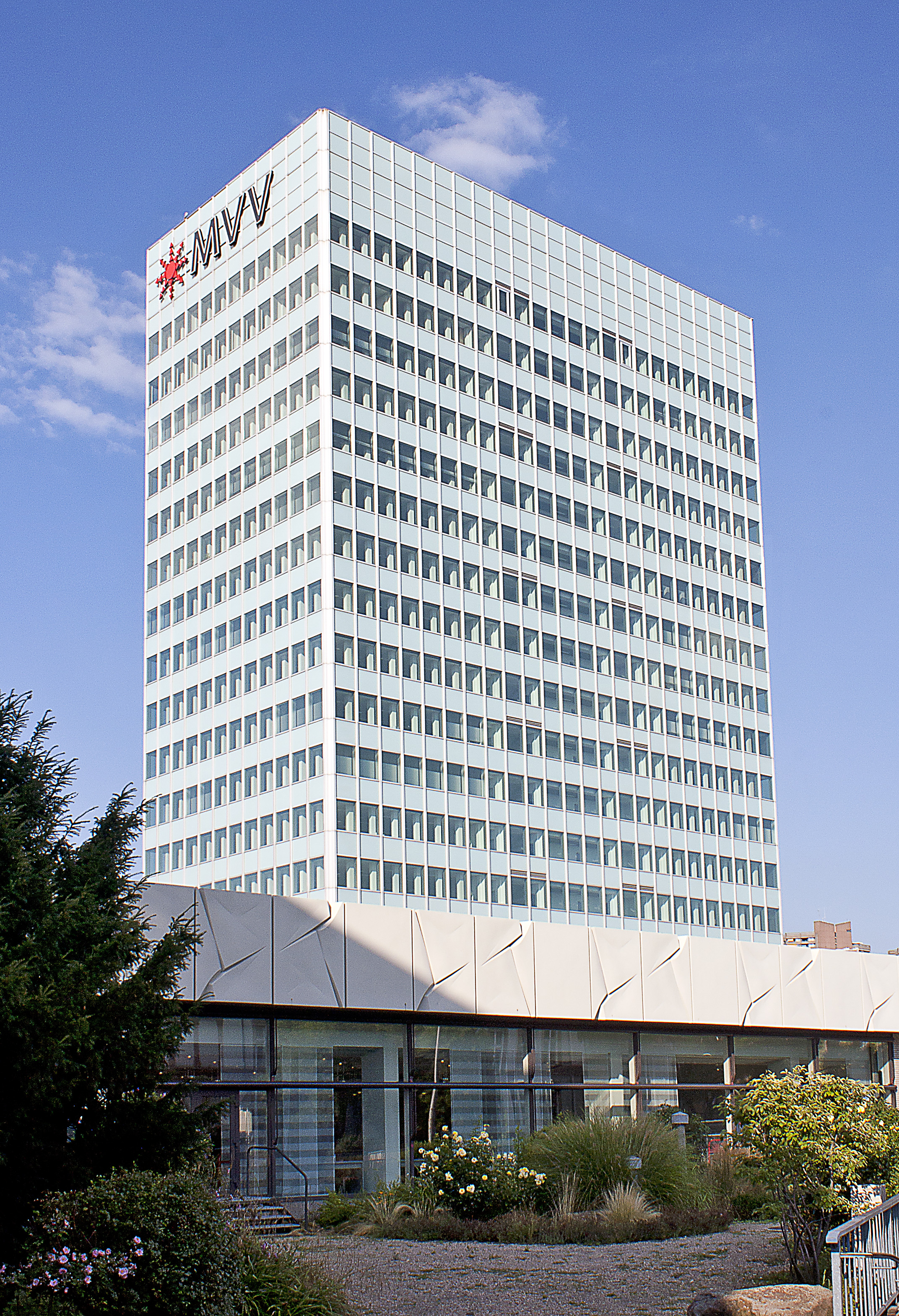
- Headquarters in Mannheim
- Company type: Public (Aktiengesellschaft)
- Industry: Energy supply
- Founded: March 1999
- Headquarters: Mannheim, Germany
- Key people: Georg Müller (CEO); Peter Kurz (Supervisory board)
- Number of employees: 6,200
- Website: www.mvv.de

MVV Energie AG (English: MVV Energy) is a publicly listed company based in Mannheim and one of Germany's leading energy suppliers, operating in both Germany as well as Europe.

The value chain of MVV Energie AG covers: generation, trading, distribution via proprietary grids, energy sales and other innovative energy-related services. The group also belongs to Germany’s leading company in generating energy from biomass and waste.

== History and shareholder structure ==
In 1974, the state-owned Mannheimer Stadtwerke was outsourced in Mannheimer Versorgungs- und Verkehrsgesellschaft mbH (MVV), today MVV GmbH. The individual branches of the industry were divided into various subsidiaries, one of which was Stadtwerke Mannheim AG (SMA). In 1998, SMA was renamed as MVV Energie.

In March 1999, the company became the first municipal company partially privatized through an IPO, with a free float of just 4.8 percent of its equity. The City of Mannheim is the majority shareholder since then. In October 2007, the RheinEnergie in Cologne acquired a share of 16.1% from the city Mannheim. As a result, the shareholder structure looked as follows in February 2015:

50.1% city Mannheim (indirectly via MVV GmbH)
16.3% RheinEnergie
22.5% EnBW
6.3% GDF Suez
4.8% Free Float

In 2017, EnBW bought a 6.28 percent stake in MVV Energie from French energy group Engie, increasing its holding to 28.76 percent. In 2019, both EnBW and RheinEnergie decided to sell their holdings of 45.1 percent in MVV Energie; Australian infrastructure investor First State Investments eventually bought it for 753 million euros ($816 million) in 2020.

From 1999 to 2013, the company belonged to the SDAX.

== Investments ==
MVV Energie holds shares in Stadtwerke Kiel (51.0%), Energieversorgung Offenbach (48.5%), Stadtwerke Ingolstadt (48.4%), Stadtwerke Buchen (25.1%), Köthen Energie (100%) as well as Stadtwerke Sinsheim (30.0%), Walldorf (25.1%) and Schwetzingen (10.0%). The company holds shares in 16 district heating companies in the Czech Republic.

In Mannheim MVV Energie holds total shares of 28% in the power plant (GKM).

Since October 2014, the 100% subsidiary Windwärts Energie GmbH has been responsible for wind turbines' projects of the MVV Energie.

End of 2014, in term of a capital increase MVV Energie acquired 50.1% shares of the project development company Juwi.

In November 2014, the Beegy GmbH was founded as a joint venture of MVV Energie with the Munich trade and services group BayWa r.e., the Irish heating and cooling system manufacturer Glen Dimplex and the Munich-based software specialist GreenCom Networks. BEEGY provides services and products for smart, decentralized energy management.

== Current investments ==
MVV Environment Ltd., a subsidiary of MVV Umwelt GmbH, is currently building in the British Plymouth a waste incineration plant, which will go into operation in 2015.

In Ridham Dock by Sittingbourne (Kent), MVV Environment Ltd. builds a biomass power plant, which will also be completed in 2015.

After the biomethane plant in Klein Wanzleben (2012), since 2014 a second biomethane plant in Kroppenstedt (both Saxony-Anhalt) has fed a sustainably produced biomethane into the natural gas grid.

A third plant of the group in Staßfurt (Saxony-Anhalt) is put into operation 2015.
