= OnForce Solar =

OnForce Solar is an American company that sells and installs solar energy packages for commercial customers. It was founded in 2007.

OnForce Solar is the largest New York based turnkey solar provider that owns and installs solar photovoltaic systems for commercial, and utility scale projects. According to Crain's it had revenue of $18.2 million and a three-year growth rate of 811% in 2012.

According to the New York Daily News, "OnForce Solar has received $6 million, the highest allotment possible. Only two other solar companies in the country have received equal subsidies from NYSERDA to operate locally," which, said the News, places "OnForce Solar in strong position to lead solar consumers into the next era of energy consumption..."

In 2012 OnForce Solar completed what was then the second-largest installation of a solar energy system in New York city.

In January 2013 OnForce purchased an interest in Lita Brothers General Construction of Bergenfield, NJ, a company that constructs roofing for commercial and residential targets. The company announced plans to combine its solar installations with roofing work by Lita Brothers.

The company has been offering lease deals with limited down payments by exploiting governmental incentives. However, news reports state that these packages are not good deals for all situations.

The company is headquartered in the Bronx, New York and has regional offices in Framingham, MA, Fort Lee, NJ, and Stamford, CT.
