= EIQ Energy =

eIQ Energy, Inc.
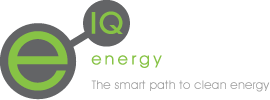
- Industry: Renewables & Environment
- Founded: 2007
- Headquarters: Santa Clara, California, United States
- Key people: Gene Krzywinski (CEO)
- Products: vBoost DC-to-DC converter module, DC-to-DC converter for storage, HV inverter off grid
- Services: MPPT, DC-to-DC power electronics, balance of systems
- Website: www.eiqenergy.com

eIQ Energy, Inc. is a startup that designs and manufactures power electronics for solar photovoltaic systems.

The company's Parallel Solar technology, built around the boost DC converter module, is intended to reduce overall system costs and enable a true parallel architecture, benefiting system designers, installers and operators.

eIQ Energy was founded in 2007 and is headquartered in Santa Clara, California.

== History ==
eIQ Energy was Established in 2007. The company officially launched the vBoost DC-to-DC converter module in September 2009 (with $10 million funding from NGEN Partners and Robert Bosch Venture Capital GmbH (RBVC).

== Management ==
Gene Krzywinski is the CEO of eIQ Energy, Inc. William Reed is the CTO.

== Products ==
eIQ Energy's primary products are the vBoost 250, 300, 350 and 600 which are DC-to-DC converter modules that step-up panel output voltages and create a parallel connection to a constant-voltage bus. With the vBoost converter module, each panel becomes an independent contributor of power to the array.

A parallel architecture allows a greater number of panels to be connected on a single cable run (which can include more than 100 thin-film panels), an increase over conventional series-string design. Furthermore, eIQ Energy's Parallel Solar architecture eliminates the need for a return line, and because each vBoost comes with an integrated wiring harness and connector, the only on-site wiring needed is from the first vBoost to the combiner box and from the combiner box to the inverter.

== Distributors ==
eIQ Energy, Inc. has signed distribution agreements with different companies like SDE Solar, Seven Green Summits, WSE Technologies, Generation PV and RA Power Incorporated. Generation PV, Inc. of Markham and WSE Technology of Saskatoon are Canadian companies that have non-exclusive national rights to sell vBoost and eIQ Energy’s Parallux family of products. In addition to the Canadian companies, the other distributors also have non-exclusive national distribution rights for the vBoost modules.

== Partners ==
eIQ Energy Inc. has deals with PV Powered & Signet Solar with their parallel solar technology. PV Powered supplies inverters, which convert the DC power generated by solar panels to AC. Signet Solar’s SI S4 thin-film quarter-panel solar modules are in concordance with eIQ Energy’s vBoost 350 DC-to-DC converter modules.

eIQ Energy has also partnered with KACO New Energy Inc., to bring eIQ's vBoost DC optimizers and KACO's blueplanet XP100-U inverters into one pre-tested and pre-configured package for solar array designers.
