= Taihe, Linshui County =

Taihe 太和镇
- Town
- Location in Sichuan
- Coordinates: 30°30′41″N 107°3′30″E
- Country: People's Republic of China
- Province: Sichuan
- Prefecture-level city: Guang'an
- County: Linshui County
- Time zone: UTC+8 (China Standard)

Taihe (Chinese: 太和; pinyin: Tàihé) is a town under the administration of Linshui County, Sichuan, China. As of 2020, it administers the following three residential neighborhoods and seven villages:

Neighborhoods

- Luokuangba Community (箩筐坝社区)
- Puxin Community (普新社区)
- Xinzhen Community (新镇社区)

Villages

- Huluba Village (葫芦坝村)
- Liujia'an Village (刘家庵村)
- Yangtiangou Village (秧田沟村)
- Qinggangping Village (青杠坪村)
- Gaojiamiao Village (高家庙村)
- Jinpan Village (金盘村)
- Tianpo Village (天坡村)
