= Soventix GmbH =

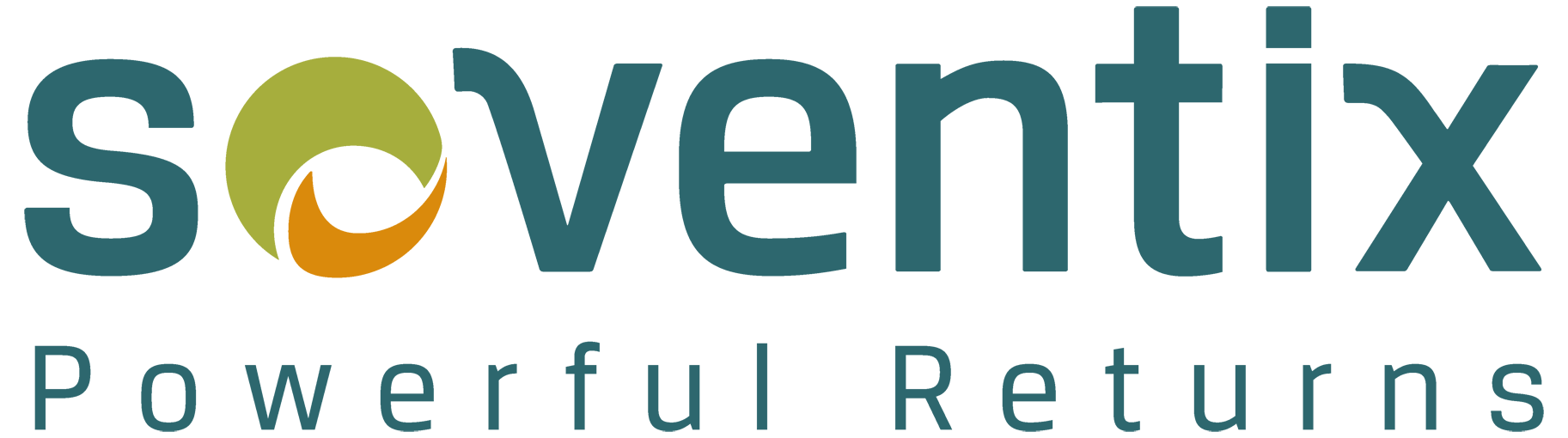
- Company type: Privately held
- Industry: Renewable energy, Solar power
- Founded: 2010
- Founder: Thorsten Preugschas
- Headquarters: Wesel, Germany
- Area served: Worldwide
- Key people: Thorsten Preugschas (CEO); Tobias Friedrich (COO); Alexandros Aris Papachristou (COO); Matthias Nimmich (CFO)
- Products: Solar PV, BESS, Hybrid Energy Systems, Microgrid Control
- Services: EPC, Project Development, solar photovoltaic (PV), O&M
- Website: www.soventix.com

Soventix GmbH is a global renewable energy company specializing in the development, engineering, procurement, and construction (EPC), and operation of utility-scale solar photovoltaic (PV) and battery storage (BESS) systems. Headquartered in Wesel, Germany, the company is registered under the commercial register number HRB 24559 at the District Court of Duisburg. As of 2026, the company manages a global project pipeline exceeding 2.0 GWp and has realized over 1 GWp of solar capacity across four continents.

== History ==
Soventix was founded in 2010 as a project development vehicle for Sovello AG, with Thorsten Preugschas appointed as CEO. From 2011 to 2013, the company achieved rapid international expansion, establishing subsidiaries in South Africa, Canada, and the United Kingdom.

In 2019, CEO Thorsten Preugschas completed a Management Buy-Out (MBO) of the group, transitioning it into an independent global entity. In November 2024, the management team acquired a 38% stake in the company to further align leadership with its utility-scale growth targets. By 2025, the company shifted its strategic focus toward high-complexity "Mine-to-Energy" projects and large-scale hybrid systems that provide baseload power to heavy industry.

== Regional Operations ==
=== Africa ===
The company is a technical leader in the African mining energy transition, delivering dispatchable renewable power to off-grid industrial sites.

- Democratic Republic of the Congo: Soventix serves as the technical lead for the 222 MWp solar PV and 526 MWh BESS facility at the Kamoa-Kakula Copper Complex. In partnership with CrossBoundary Energy, the facility is designed to deliver 30 MW of continuous baseload renewable power.
- South Africa: Based in Stellenbosch, the unit is co-developing the 1 GWp De Aar solar cluster, featuring advanced Agrivoltaic testing with local sheep farming.
- Zimbabwe: Soventix SA developed the 22 MW Harava PV project in Seke Rural district, featuring a 10% community ownership trust.
- Madagascar: Completed a 14.5 MWp solar PV, wind, and BESS hybrid expansion at the Rio Tinto QMM Mineral Sands mine.

=== Americas ===
- Dominican Republic: Completed the 33.4 MWp Monte Plata Solar Park (Phase I) in 2016, which was the largest utility-scale solar plant in the Caribbean at commissioning.
- Chile: Active in the PMGD (distributed generation) market since 2014, constructing 15 projects including the Faramalla, Pesaro, and Sirimavo utility sites.

=== Europe ===
- Germany: Domestic operations focus on utility-scale ground-mounted parks (e.g., Kalsow 26 MWp) and specialized Floating solar projects like the Ellerdonksee project in North Rhine-Westphalia.

== Technical Differentiators ==
The company utilizes proprietary Micro Grid Control Solutions (MCS) to integrate solar and battery systems with existing thermal (diesel/HFO) power plants. This allows heavy industrial users to reach renewable energy penetration levels exceeding 85% while maintaining frequency stability in remote or weak-grid conditions.

== Notable Projects ==
Project	Location	Capacity	Status
Kamoa-Kakula Baseload	Democratic Republic of Congo	222 MWp + 526 MWh BESS	Under Construction (COD 2026)
Monte Plata Solar Park	Dominican Republic	33.4 MWp	Operational
Kalsow Solar Park	Germany	26 MWp	Completed 2025
Harava PV Project	Zimbabwe	22 MWp	Completed 2022
QMM Rio Tinto Mine	Madagascar	14.5 MWp Hybrid	Operational
