= Semper Solaris =

- Type: Private
- Industry: Construction; Home improvement Solar energy
- Founded: March 9, 2012; 14 years ago in San Diego, California (incorporated)
- Founders: John Almond; Kelly Shawhan
- Areas served: San Diego County, Orange County, Los Angeles County, Riverside County, and the Bay Area of California
- Key people: John Almond; CEO; Kelly Shawhan; COO
- Products: Solar panels Roofing
- Services: Installation; Replacement
- Website: Official website

Semper Solaris Construction, Inc. is a residential solar power installation company based in San Diego, California, founded by Kelly Shawhan and John Almond in 2012. The company is known for its angle of hiring former Marines within the solar industry, as well as its focus on American culture in its marketing.

== History ==
Semper Solaris founder John Almond was previously involved in the construction business, and had changed his focus to solar energy upon establishing the company. It was said co-founder Kelly Shawhan had worked in solar energy since 1989. Kelly Shawhan was previously a United States Marine Corps captain. It was reported the company's name choice was based on the Marine Corps motto "semper fidelis" and an oath that Shawhan had with 12 other Marines in the Philippines in 1985.

In 2015, the company installed a total 0.400 megawatts that year which reportedly fluctuated from 0.200 in 2014. Solar manufacturer SunPower gave the company a 'Residential National Dealer of the Year' title in 2015.

In 2016, three Semper Solaris employees had stopped to save two passengers out of burning box truck, which had driven off Route 163's guardrail and onto the Route 305 in San Diego County. The Semper Solaris employees, received a "Special Commendation" from the Mayor's office of San Diego.

== Corporate affairs ==
The company is known for its hiring of former Marines and United States Military which in return coalesces a company culture based on the values of the said military cultures. Homeboy Industries's "Solar Panel Training Program" have been linked to the company's hiring of ex-convicts.

Semper Solaris has charted Solar Power World's Top Solar Contractors list for four years.

Jawad Khan of Business.com's marketing journal reported that the company's supporting of military and local businesses, as well as American made products were a distinct angle in online marketing. Khan stated that the company's expression of values would be effective for certain audiences. In 2013, Joseph Calack of engineering journal RFCafe praised the dealer for its transparent sale of a photovoltaic SunPower solar system.
