= PV Crystalox Solar =

PV Crystalox Solar plc
- Company type: Public
- Traded as: LSE: PVCS
- Industry: solar energy, photovoltaics
- Founded: 1982
- Headquarters: Abingdon, Oxfordshire, UK
- Key people: John Sleeman (Chairman); Dr. Iain Dorrity (CEO); Dr. Peter Finnegan (CFO); Dr. Hubert Aulich (Director)
- Products: silicon ingots, blocks and wafers
- Revenue: €46.3 million (2012)
- Number of employees: 311(2012)
- Website: pvcrystalox.com

PV Crystalox Solar plc is a supplier to solar cell manufacturers, producing multicrystalline silicon wafers for use in solar electricity generation systems. It has operations in Germany, United Kingdom and Japan and its headquarters are in the United Kingdom. It is listed on the London Stock Exchange and was a former constituent of the FTSE 250 Index.

== History ==
Crystalox was established as a private limited company in 1982 in the town of Wantage in Oxfordshire specialising in the design and manufacture of equipment for purification and crystal growth of metals, alloys, semiconductors and electro-optic materials. In 1990 the company started development of industrial production systems for directional solidification of multicrystalline silicon for the solar cell industry.

In 1994, there was a management buy-out by 6 senior managers. 1997 saw the incorporation of PV Silicon AG in Erfurt, Germany, a specialist silicon wafer producer. A strategic partnership was formed between Crystalox and PV Silicon in 1999, which progressed to the merging of the two companies in 2002 and the incorporation of PV Crystalox AG. In 2006, the decision was taken to build a silicon production plant in Germany.

In June 2007, the company made its debut on the London Stock Exchange to raise additional funds for in-house silicon production and to further expand its international business. Between September 2007 and March 2010 the group was a constituent of the FTSE 250 index.

== Technology and products ==
The company's industrial focus comprises the production of the polysilicon raw material at its factory in Bitterfeld in Germany, melting and crystallization of the silicon to form ingots at various sites around Abingdon in the UK, and converting the ingots into thin multicrystalline silicon wafers internally at the company's facility in Erfurt in Germany and externally at subcontractors in Japan.

These wafers are then sold to companies in the photovoltaics industry, where they are transformed into solar cells using semiconductor processing technology, linked together in strings and laminated between glass and plastic sheets to form durable modules.
