= Solarwatt =

German photovoltaic manufacturer

Solarwatt GmbH
- Type: Private
- Industry: Photovoltaics, renewable energy
- Founded: 1993
- Founders: Lothar Schlegel; Frank Schneider
- Headquarters: Dresden, Germany
- Area served: Europe
- Parent: Aqton SE
- Website: www.solarwatt.com

Solarwatt is a German photovoltaic manufacturer and systems provider producing solar panels, inverters, home batteries, energy-management software and electric-vehicle chargers for residential and small commercial applications.

Solarwatt is part of a group structure under the majority ownership of Aqton SE.

== History ==
Solarwatt was founded in 1993 in Dresden, Germany, as SOLARWATT Solar-Systeme GmbH, initially operating as a photovoltaics research and development company. In its early years, the company produced PV modules for specialist applications. In 1995, it began series production of impact-resistant small modules used in applications such as emergency call boxes and vending machines.

In 1996, entrepreneur and investor Stefan Quandt made his first investment in the company and later became its sole owner. In 1998, Solarwatt developed the glass–glass solar module, embedding solar cells between glass panels on both sides rather than using a conventional polymer backsheet. This design significantly improved durability and, by the mid-2020s, became widely adopted across the industry.

The company converted into a public limited company, Solarwatt AG, in 2005 and completed an initial public offering. In 2010, it opened its first fully integrated solar panel production line in Dresden.

Amid the global photovoltaic market downturn, Solarwatt entered self-administered insolvency proceedings in 2011. The majority of shares were subsequently acquired by Stefan Quandt’s investment company Aqton SE, and the business was restructured as Solarwatt GmbH, returning to private ownership. Through Aqton SE, Solarwatt became affiliated with the BMW Group investment portfolio.

In 2012, the company relaunched with a strategic shift toward integrated photovoltaic systems, combining solar modules with battery storage and energy management services. In 2013, it introduced its first energy management product in cooperation with sister company Kiwigrid GmbH.

In 2015, Solarwatt launched Solarwatt MyReserve, a DC-coupled residential battery system. That same year, it expanded internationally by acquiring the French and Dutch subsidiaries of Centrosolar and establishing Solarwatt Italia S.r.l.

In April 2016, Solarwatt acquired the German storage technology specialist e-Wolf. In 2017, the company opened a battery storage production line in Dresden. In 2021, Solarwatt introduced SOLARWATT Battery flex, a modular home storage system developed in cooperation with the BMW Group and using cell technology similar to that employed in electric vehicles such as the Mini Electric. The system was offered in AC- and DC-coupled versions and manufactured in Germany. The company also launched Solarwatt Technologies Ltd. to serve the United Kingdom and Ireland and opened a new F8 solar panel production line in Dresden. In 2022, Solarwatt entered into a technical cooperation with Stiebel Eltron to optimise heat pump systems through integration with photovoltaic generation and battery storage. In May 2022, Solarwatt purchased the Dutch battery specialist REConvert with REConvert continuing to trade under its own name from its Utrecht headquarters. In July 2022, Solarwatt became the first German solar module manufacturer to receive a Cradle to Cradle silver certification for its sustainable glass–glass photovoltaic modules produced in Dresden.

In 2023, the company installed its ten millionth solar panel on a residential rooftop in Suffolk, United Kingdom. Due to challenging market conditions, Solarwatt paused production in Germany in 2024 and shifted manufacturing to selected Asian contract partners. In September 2024, it launched Solarwatt Home, a smart-home product suite.

In February 2024, Solarwatt acquired a majority stake (60%) in the installation company Ahrens Solar- und Dachtechnik, a regional installer of photovoltaic systems and EV charging infrastructure.

== Products and technology ==
The company’s core products are glass–glass photovoltaic modules designed for durability, long service life, and resistance to environmental stress. In addition to solar panels, Solarwatt offers modular home battery storage systems intended to increase on-site consumption of solar energy. Hybrid inverters form part of the company’s integrated home system, enabling coordinated control of solar generation and battery storage.

=== Installations ===
Solarwatt panels and systems have been used in a number of high-profile projects, including stadium and institutional rooftops as well as residential installations across Europe. At the Berlin Olympic Stadium in Berlin, 1,614 Solarwatt photovoltaic panels were installed on the stadium roof. The system generates approximately 615,000 kWh of electricity annually, an amount described as roughly equivalent to the yearly consumption of around 205 three-person households.

Solarwatt modules were also used at BMW Welt in Munich, completed in 2007. The building’s 16,500 m² roof integrates approximately 3,660 Solarwatt solar modules. In early 2025, 184 Solarwatt Panel vision M 5.0 black modules were installed on the South Quire roof of York Minster in England. The panels were incorporated into the cathedral’s renewable energy programme.
