= Mass Megawatts Wind Power =

Mass Megawatts Wind Power, Inc.
- Company type: corporation
- Traded as: OTC Pink Current: MMMW
- Industry: Technology
- Founded: 1997
- Headquarters: Worcester, Massachusetts, United States
- Key people: Jonathan Carl Ricker, President & CEO
- Products: Wind turbines, renewable energy, developing a solar tracking product
- Services: none
- Revenue: 0
- Net income: 0
- Number of employees: 0
- Website: Mass Megawatts Wind Energy

Mass Megawatts Wind Power, Inc. is a company that produces wind turbines and sells wind-generated electricity. The company intends to build and operate wind energy power plants and plans to sell the electricity to the electric power exchange. Mass Megawatts Wind Power was founded on May 27, 1997 and is headquartered in Worcester, Massachusetts, United States. As well as developing its own proprietary wind power systems it also engages in distributing wind generated electricity it purchases wholesale.

In late 2014, the company announced plans to enter the American solar power market. The Solar Tracking System (STS) utilizes minimal moving parts and electrical components, resulting in increased stability and lower operating costs. The STS claims to improve solar energy production levels by more than 20%.

== See also ==
- Alternative energy
- Solar power
- Energy in the United States
