= Signet Solar =

Signet Solar is a defunct solar company that was established in 2006 in Menlo Park, California. They produced photovoltaic modules, and have manufacturing plants in India and Germany. The modules are made using thin film silicon technology on large area (5.7 m^{2} (61 sq ft)) glass substrates, referred to as Gen 8.5. They filed for Chapter 11 bankruptcy protection in 2012.

== India ==
Signet Solar India, started in 2007, was planning to have the capacity to produce 300 MWp/year by 2012. The factory was located near Chennai.

== Germany ==
The plant in Mochau, near Dresden, began production in 2008 and was expected to have the capacity to produce 120 MWp/year by 2010.

== New Mexico ==
In December, plans were announced to begin construction of a plant in Belen, New Mexico, with an initial capacity of 65 MWp/year when it was to be completed in 2010, and an eventual capacity of 300 MWp/year. The plant was located in a 6,000 acres (2,400 ha) master planned industrial and residential community, called Rancho Cielo, and was expected to provide the panels for a 700 acres (280 ha), 600 MW solar farm, to provide the majority of the power for the community.

== See also ==
- Solar power in India
