= Solar Electric Power Company =

- Type: Private
- Industry: Solar Energy
- Founded: 1994
- Headquarters: 1521 SE Palm Court, Stuart, FL, 34994 United States
- Area served: Worldwide
- Key people: Steve Robbins (CEO)
- Products: Outdoor Solar Lighting
- Website: www.sepco-solarlighting.com

Solar Electric Power Company is a manufacturer of solar lighting and remote solar power stations that utilize compact fluorescent lamps CFL, light emitting diodes LED, metal halide, induction, low pressure sodium, and high pressure sodium and is based in Stuart, Florida. Steve Robbins, the founder and president, designed and patented the first commercial solar street light.

== Technology ==
Single crystal solar panel are used in solar power assemblies which provide maximum efficiency in the smallest size available. The solar panel backs are covered by vented aluminum panel pans to protect against weather, vandalism, and other types of damage.

The vented battery box contains the battery of the size needed for the application while also providing a minimum of 3 days autonomy. These batteries are deep cycle sealed GEL cell batteries that are non-hazardous and fully recyclable.

As with any solar power device, control electronics are housed within the battery box and can be set to a variety of times from dusk to dawn, dusk for a set number of hours, to a programmable time clock for operation at only specific times of day or night.

== Applications ==
SEPCO manufactures off-grid solar power and solar lighting systems for low power applications and commercial lighting applications.

== Awards ==
Green to Gold Award 2010

== See also ==
- Energy law
