= NuWatt Energy =

American provider of energy services

- Type: Private
- Industry: Energy production, Energy storage
- Founded: 2009; 17 years ago
- Founders: Dr. Aiman Alawa
- Headquarters: Austin, Texas & Woburn, Massachusetts
- Areas served: 5 states
- Website: nuwattenergy.com

NuWatt Energy is a company that specializes in solar energy services and is headquartered in Austin, Texas, and Woburn, Massachusetts. NuWatt Energy markets, manufactures, and installs residential and commercial solar panels in Texas, Massachusetts, California, Vermont, and New Hampshire. NuWatt Energy specializes in turn-key solar electric (photovoltaic) solutions for residential, commercial, and institutional clients in New England.

In 2017, NuWatt Energy worked with the town of Lexington, Massachusetts to retrofit a “solar noise barrier.” The barrier generates 825 megawatt hours (MWh) per year of electricity.

== History ==
NuWatt Energy was founded in 2009 by Dr. Aiman Alawa, based on his structural engineering expertise and an examination of the future of global energy.

== Innovation ==
NuWatt has been at the forefront of innovating the rise of solar PV noise barriers (PVNB), which serve both as noise barriers and power generation facilities for local communities and Departments of Transportation (DOTs). It is privately funded, PVNBs are built using private funds, which ensures expansion without federal or state budget impact. The energy produced is then sold at a discount to DOTs or communities.

== See also ==
- Efficient energy use
- List of energy storage projects
- Solar power
