= SunCore Corporation =

- Industry: Solar Mobile Power
- Founded: 2004
- Headquarters: Irvine, California,
- Area served: Worldwide
- Key people: Steven Brimmer (CEO)
- Products: NovaCell, NovaCell Plus, IntraCell, SmartCell
- Number of employees: 50
- Website: www.suncoresolar.com

SunCore Corporation is a company that produces light-powered intelligent charging systems to power today's mobile devices for original equipment manufacturers (OEMs), operators (service providers) and distributors, cofounded in 2004 by The Brimmer Family in Irvine, California.

== Technology ==
SunCore's light-powered intelligent charging systems use proprietary photovoltaic (PV) panel technology to harvest light energy with a sensitive range of 300 to 1200 nanometers, well beyond the visible light spectrum. The system recharges devices using ambient light. This allows charging to occur indoors as opposed to direct sunlight to charge. The systems' microcontroller-based charge-management circuitry and software optimizes the absorbed energy's high efficiency transfer from the PV panel to the battery, as the device is moved within varying light conditions.

== NovaCell® ==
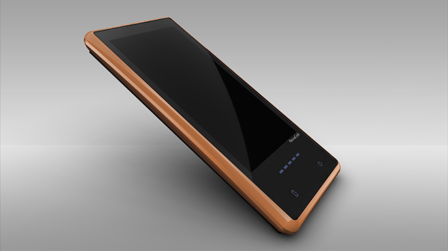
SunCore's NovaCell

The NovaCell® is a light-driven, handheld charger that connects to today's most popular mobile devices and increases user operating time between battery charges. The NovaCell combines proprietary technologies to harvest energy from virtually any light condition-indoor ambient and incandescent to sunlight and shade.

Photovoltaic (PV) Panel—Proprietary, monolithically interconnected back-point junction PV panel is responsible for a spectral sensitivity range of 300 - 1200 nanometers.

Charge Management—Built-in intelligence of the microcontroller-based charge-management circuitry and software optimize the absorbed energy's high-efficiency transfer rate from the PV panel to the battery, as the NovaCell is moved within and between varying light conditions. This process ensures the greatest voltage level and current output.

Battery Power Indicators—Centered on the lower faceplate, five LED lights indicate the power level of the built-in lithium battery. Each LED light represents the remaining battery power at 20% increments with an accuracy of 1%.

Light Positioning Indicators—A sun icon, also on the face plate, continuously displays charge strength under various light conditions. The icon's intensity signals when optimal exposure to light is achieved, maximizing charge output. An intense, brightly lit icon shows the ideal light level for greatest power output.
