= Enviromena Power Systems =

Enviromena International Holdings Limited
- Company type: Private
- Industry: Renewable Energy
- Founded: 2007
- Founder: Sami Khoreibi
- Headquarters: Reading, United Kingdom
- Number of locations: Dubai, United Arab Emirates, Reading, United Kingdom
- Area served: Europe
- Key people: Adrian Pike Chairman, Chris Marsh CEO
- Number of employees: 40
- Divisions: Development, Asset Management, Operations & Maintenance, Project Management
- Subsidiaries: Enviromena Power Systems LLC
- Website: www.enviromena.com

Enviromena is a clean energy technology company in Europe. It has installed more than 17,000 solar systems. The company has over 425 MW of solar power plants under operation and a further 200 MW under construction.

Enviromena was founded in 2007 by Sami Khoreibi. At the time Sander Trestain was COO, and Erik Voldner was CCO. Voldner was responsible for establishing the regions first solar EPC. In 2018, Enviromena was sold to Arjun Infrastructure Partners and the founding team departed the business.

Cabell Fisher was appointed as CEO, Stuart Bannerman as CFO, Matthew Wells as CLO, and David McLeod as CAO. In 2021, McLeod, Wells and Bannerman left the company to pursue other opportunities and the business relocated to Reading, England, retaining only Cabell Fisher as MENA CEO based in the UAE.

Chris Marsh heads up the (now only UK & Europe) business as Chief Executive Officer. Marsh is supported by Christina Allen, Gary Hales, Lee Adams, and Mark Harding. Adrian Pike has been Chairman since 2020, in his 2nd spell as Chair, having previously served as Chairman in 2018.

== Major Projects ==
Since 2018, the company has broken ground on over 600 megawatts (MW) of solar power in four countries: UK, Egypt, Jordan and the UAE.

The Masdar 10MW Solar Power Plant is the largest grid connected photovoltaic solar plant in the Middle East and North Africa and was the first project to be designed and installed by Enviromena Power Systems. The project was commissioned in June 2009 and was the first utility scale solar plant to be connected to the Abu Dhabi Municipal Grid, which is run by the Abu Dhabi Distribution Company. Enviromena holds the operations and maintenance contract for this project.

In 2013, Enviromena completed a Masdar-financed 15MWp PV power plant in Mauritania, which at the time of its inauguration was Africa's largest photovoltaic power plant. The $32M project, the first utility-scale installation in the country, will provide up to ten percent of Mauritania's power, and offset approximately 22,880 tons of carbon emissions per year.

The 11MWp Masdar PV Solar Power Plant in Gotha, Germany incorporates innovative driven-post and screw-post solar racking solutions. The 288,000 square meter PV plant became operational in 2012 and produces approximately 11,000 MWh of energy per year. The plant is connected to the local municipal grid, and offsets approximately 15,750 tons of carbon emissions yearly.

The PV/Diesel Hybrid System is the UAE's first solar-diesel hybrid not requiring batteries. It provides round-the-clock electricity to a remote, off-grid residential complex in Abu Dhabi. This system provides 24-hour power solution, with a 2.4MW set of diesel generators, and a 755kWp solar PV system. A microgrid interconnects the two power sources and delivers power to end users. Because of its proximity to the sea, Enviromena's team of engineers designed a unique corrosion-resistant racking system using glass reinforced plastics instead of metal. The Al Jarnain hybrid plant produces 1,336MWh per year, and reduces the island's fuel demand by up to 50 percent.

Most recently, Enviromena developed an innovative solar-diesel hybrid power plant in the island of Al Yassat for the Dubai Electricity and Water Agency (DEWA). The project interconnects the private island's current gen-sets with an 800 kWp PV system. Enviromena designed plant components with materials that can withstand the remote island's harsh, high salinity environment and ensure a 25-year life span. Enviromena customized a micro-grid control system to monitor instantaneous load demand and control the diesel generator operation based on the available solar PV power.

Other projects completed by Enviromena include a building integrated photovoltaic rooftop installation on Shams Tower at Yas Marina Circuit and a dual purpose solar car park shade structure at Masdar City.

Enviromena has the largest installed capacity of grid connected solar photovoltaic projects in the Middle East and North Africa with over 43 MWP across 36 projects in six countries, and an additional 28MWp currently under construction in Egypt, Jordan and Morocco.

The company, along with partner TSK of Spain, constructed Jordan's largest solar plant to date, located in Quweira. The 103 MW solar power plant was officially inaugurated on April 28, 2018. Under a 25-year power purchase agreement (PPA) with Jordan's Ministry of Energy and Mineral Resources, 50/50 joint venture partners Enviromena and TSK completed the construction in 18 months. The Quweira solar power plant was financed by the Abu Dhabi Fund for Development, totaling AED550 million.

== Investors ==
Enviromena has attracted a broad base of clean-tech venture capital investors such as Good Energies, zouk Ventures, New Energies Invest, Moez Kassam, and most recently the Masdar Cleantech Fund.[13] The company completed a series B round of fundraising in January 2010 wherein Masdar became the company's largest shareholder.
