= Sollega =

- Industry: Solar Racking
- Founded: 2009; 17 years ago
- Headquarters: San Francisco, California, U.S.
- Key people: Elie Rothschild, CEO; Lee Rothschild, Solar PV System Designer; Bryan Weinberg, Account Manager

Sollega is a US-based solar racking company that provides flat-roof and ground-mount solar arrays for commercial and industrial use. Sollega operates out of The Mission District in San Francisco, California.

== History ==
The company was founded in 2009 by Elie Rothschild, John Humphrey, and George Schnakenberg III. Sollega proposed a cheaper alternative to conventional metal solar panel mounting systems. The company produced its first racking system, the Instarack 15°. This was followed by the Instarack 10°. These were replaced with the updated Fastrack 5° in 2012. In 2014, this was replaced by the current system, the Fastrack 510.

== Major Installations ==
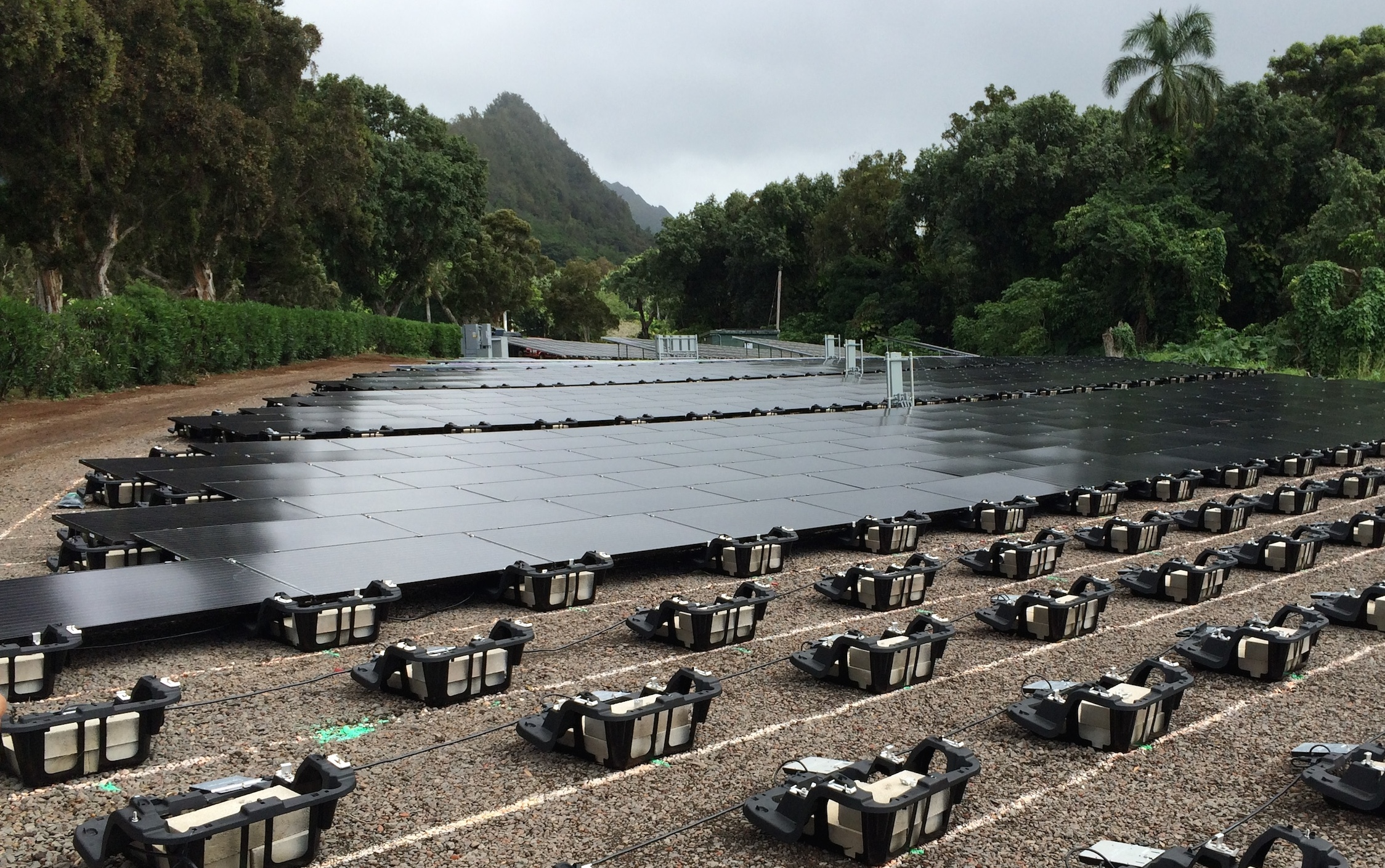
Fastrack 510 being installed in Hawaii

• Hawaii- 2.4 mW array at Hawaii Airports

• Department of Energy – 223.44 kW array

• Harvey Milk Terminal, San Francisco Airport – 1.33 MW array

• Federal Reserve, William McChesney Martin Jr. Building – 154.50 kW array

• St. Maarten- 800 kW array

• Dorado, Puerto Rico- 872 kW array

• Renton, Washington- 1.125 mW array

== Products ==
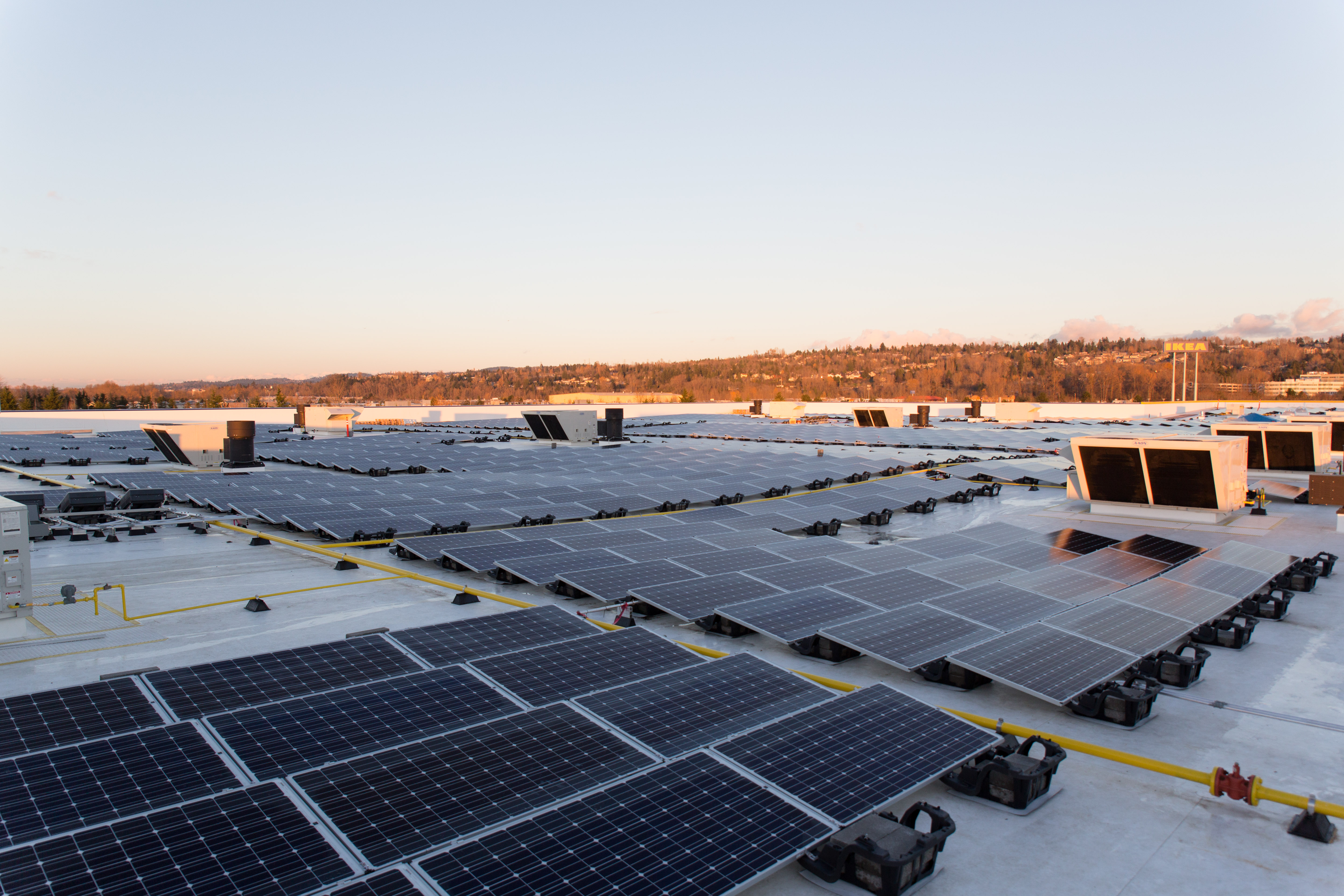
Sollega

Sollega developed a line of racking systems constructed from glass-reinforced polymer as an alternative to traditional metal racking. Its current product, the FastRack 510-6DG, is made from an engineered nylon polymer composite and was the first racking product certified under both UL 2703 and UL 3741, which pertain to electrical bonding, grounding, and rapid shutdown requirements in PV installations.
