= SunLight General Capital =

SunLight General Capital is a developer, financer, and operator of solar power plants in North America and provides solar-generated energy to commercial, government, and utility customers through Power Purchase Agreements. SunLight General Capital, founded by professionals from the solar and finance industries in 2009, has developed over 100 sites in an aggregate amount over 35 MW.It was founded by senior professionals from the solar and finance industry.

== History Overview ==
The company has started its operations in 2009 and focused initially on the northeast, in particular New Jersey and Connecticut. In 2010, SunLight General Capital started construction of several projects in New Jersey, including sites at Bergen County facilities and Teterboro Airport.

In 2011, SunLight General Capital expanded in Connecticut, with the largest solar installation at a public facility in the State, at the Ansonia Board of Education. It is also starting construction on 7 MW in projects in Somerset County, financed with an innovative municipal bond issuance, and was awarded what will be the largest ground mount project at a higher education facility in the United States, a 10 MW ground mount solar power plant to be built at Mercer County Community College.

In 2017, SunLight General Capital purchased its first solar system in California, located within the campus the San Domenico School.
