= Centrosolar =

German solar company

- Industry: Solar Power Products
- Defunct: 2014
- Fate: Bankruptcy
- Headquarters: Munich, Germany

Centrosolar, based in Munich, Germany, was one of the leading stock exchange listed solar companies in Europe. The company produced photovoltaic systems for private houses and industrial properties. Centrosolar marketed standard grid-connected systems and non-grid-connected solar power generators.

In 2008, following 10 months of construction, Centrosolar opened a 47,000 square-meter, 150 MW solar module factory in Wismar, Germany. The €23 million facility has created 250 new jobs in Wismar.

In 2014 the company declared bankruptcy. The German production facility was purchased by CS Wismar. Centrosolars subsidiaries in France and The Netherlands were acquired by the German solar producer Solarwatt and continued business as Solarwatt France SARL and Solarwatt BV.

== See also ==
- List of photovoltaics companies
- Renewable energy commercialization
