= Astonfield =

Solar tech company

Astonfield Renewable Resources
- Industry: Renewable energy
- Founded: 2005; 21 years ago
- Founders: Ameet Shah; Sourabh Sen
- Headquarters: Mittal Tower C-Wing, Office 55, Nariman Point, Mumbai, Maharashtra, India
- Website: www.astonfield.com

Astonfield Renewables Resources is a renewable energy company that builds, owns, and operates utility-scale solar power plants in emerging markets. Headquartered in Mumbai, its operational focus on India is supported by additional offices in New Delhi and Kolkata.

== History ==
Astonfield was founded in 2005 by Ameet Shah and Sourabh Sen. As an early entrant in the Indian solar market, Astonfield won one of the first solar project contracts in the country under the Jawaharlal Nehru National Solar Mission. This project, a 5 MW solar photovoltaic project at Osiyan, Rajasthan, was commissioned under the Migration Phase of the National Solar Mission, which incorporated projects already under advanced development when the Mission was launched in 2009.

In 2011, Astonfield entered a strategic partnership with the Spanish solar developer Grupo T-Solar to develop photovoltaic plants in India. The 5 MW Osiyan plant used T-Solar thin-film modules, with Schneider Electric as the engineering, procurement and construction contractor, and was financed with debt from the State Bank of India and the Export–Import Bank of India. It was among the first utility-scale solar plants commissioned in the country under the National Solar Mission.

== U.S.-India partnerships ==
In 2011, the United States Trade and Development Agency (USTDA) announced a series of agreements at the conclusion of the U.S.-India Strategic Dialogue to enhance trade opportunities between the two countries. Astonfield received a $719,985 grant to assist in the design and deployment of two solar projects in India.

In 2010, the U.S.-India Business Council, a business advocacy organization that represents U.S. companies in India and global Indian companies, selected Astonfield’s Chief Operating Officer Aparna Doshi to their Solar Power Task Force, which was an initiative to promote trade and investment in solar power.

In 2010, Astonfield was awarded the Export Achievement Award by the U.S. Department of Commerce, as well as the Global Green Award at World Trade Week NYC.

== Projects ==
As an early mover in the Indian solar market, Astonfield’s projects were 2-12 MW in size. They are gravitating toward larger projects of 25 MW and above in the coming year. In July 2013, Astonfield received an A− credit rating on loan facilities for its 5 MW solar plant in Osiyan, Rajasthan, from Credit Rating Information Services of India Limited (CRISIL), a division of the McGraw Hill Corporation and whose majority stakeholder is Standard & Poor’s. It was one of the first solar plants to have received an A level credit rating in India.

=== Power plants ===
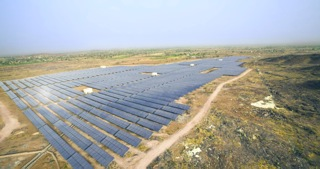
Astonfield's 5 MW solar plant in Osiyan, Rajasthan.

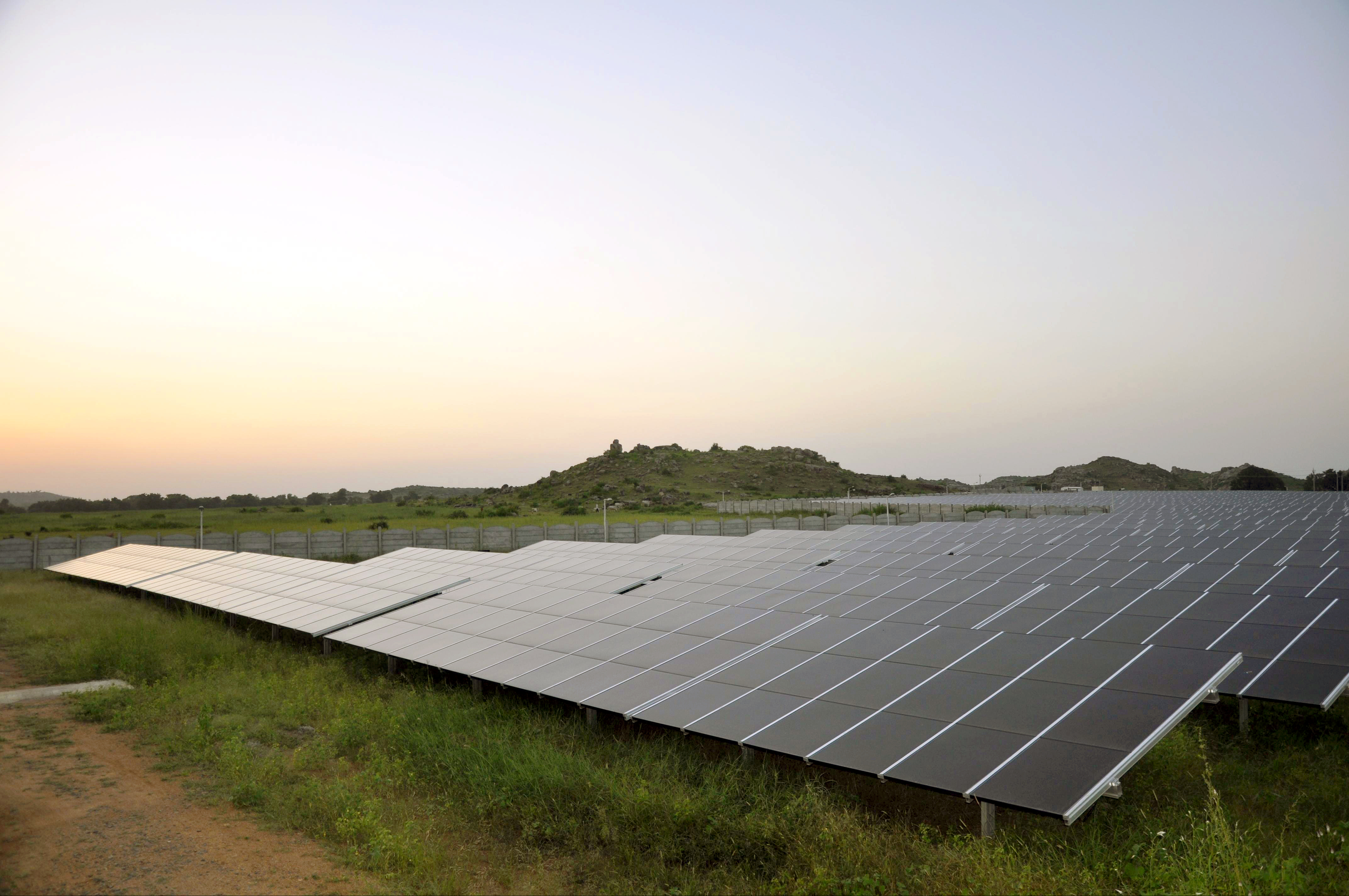
Astonfield's 2 MW solar plant in Jhansi, Uttar Pradesh.

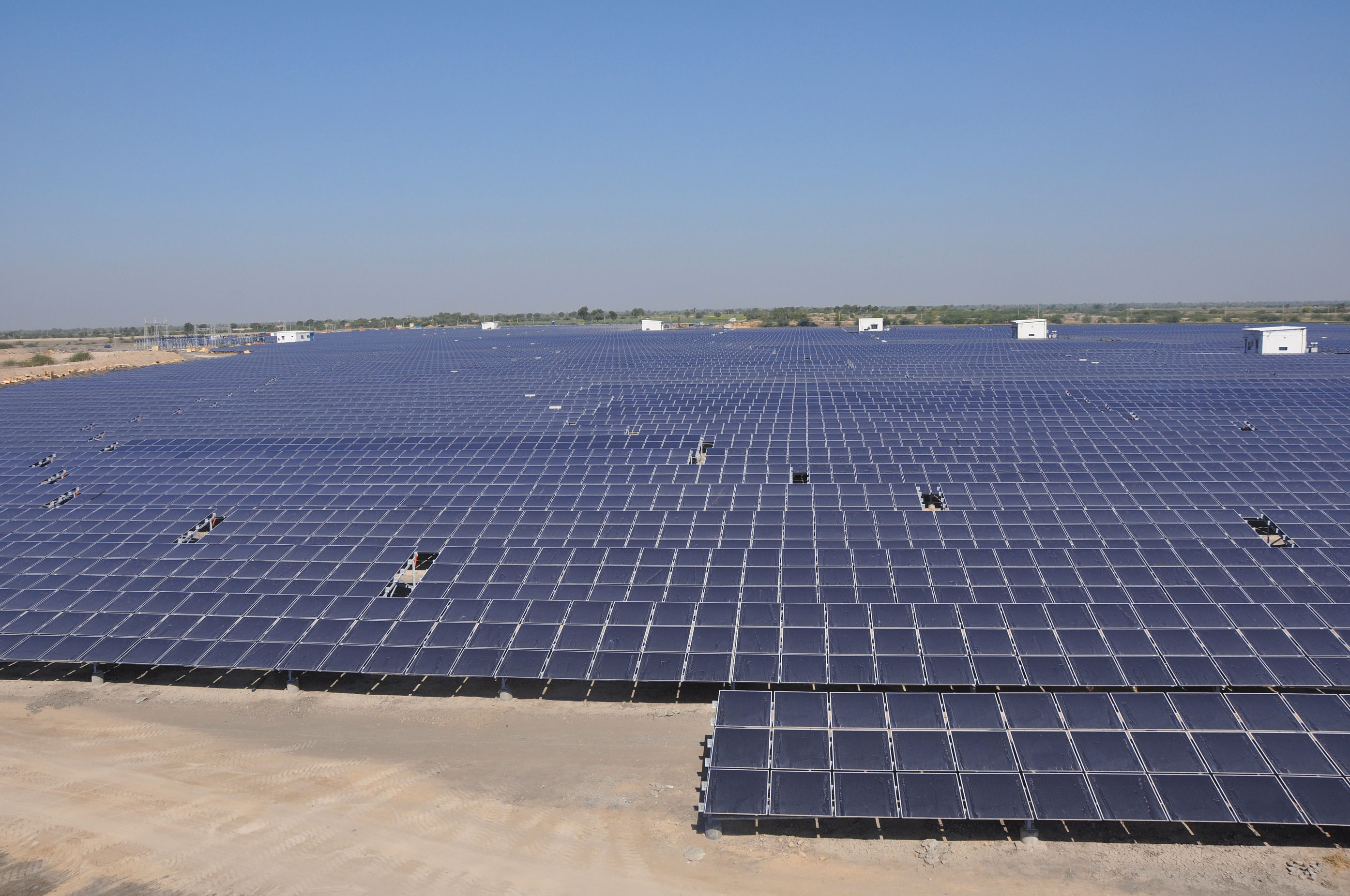
Astonfield's 11.5 MW solar plant in Gujarat, India.

Location	Type	Capacity
Osiyan, Rajasthan	Photovoltaic	5 MW
Jhansi, Uttar Pradesh	Photovoltaic	2 MW
Nayaka, Gujarat	Photovoltaic	11.5 MW

== See also ==
- Solar power in India
- Osian
- Solar Energy Corporation of India
