= RevoluSun =

Solar energy company

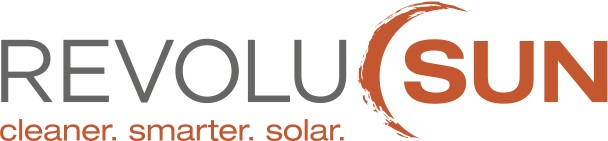
- Type: Private
- Industry: Solar Energy
- Founded: 2009
- Headquarters: Honolulu, Hawaii, U.S.
- Area served: Hawaiian Islands
- Products: Photovoltaic installations
- Number of employees: 50+ (2014)
- Website: revolusun.com

RevoluSun is a solar company headquartered in Honolulu, Hawaii, founded in 2009. RevoluSun is a residential photovoltaic installer with offices in Hawaii, Massachusetts and Idaho. To date, RevoluSun has developed more than 8,000 photovoltaic systems generating more than 50 megawatts (MW). RevoluSun’s headquarters are located at 660 Ala Moana Blvd #220a, located in Honolulu.

Currently, RevoluSun has 75 staff members and more than 20 project developers. The team's distinctions include: NABCEP-Certified Installer, Hawaii PV Coalition member, Hawaii Solar Energy Association member, Hawaii Chamber of Commerce member, CertainTeed Certified installer and Elite status SunPower dealer. Additionally, RevoluSun has a long-standing partnership with SunPower, a PV panel manufacturer.

== Locations and Franchising ==
RevoluSun is the first photovoltaic company in Hawaii to franchise on the mainland. Following the success of opening RevoluSun offices on Maui and Big Island in February 2011, RevoluSun added a franchise in Massachusetts in 2012 and New York Office in July 2013.

== Principals ==
1. Powell, Josh (CEO)
2. Yost, Colin (COO)
3. Carlson, Eric (CIO)

== Business Offerings ==
Residential Solar To date, RevoluSun has developed more than 6,500 photovoltaic systems generating more than 54 MW of power.
