= Grenergy =

Spanish renewable energy company

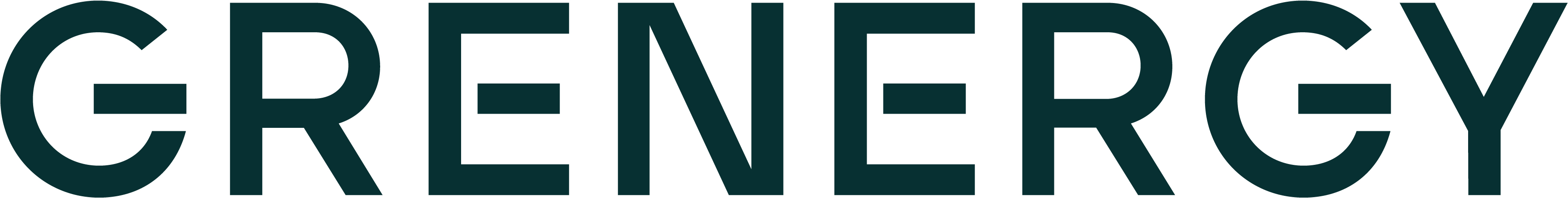

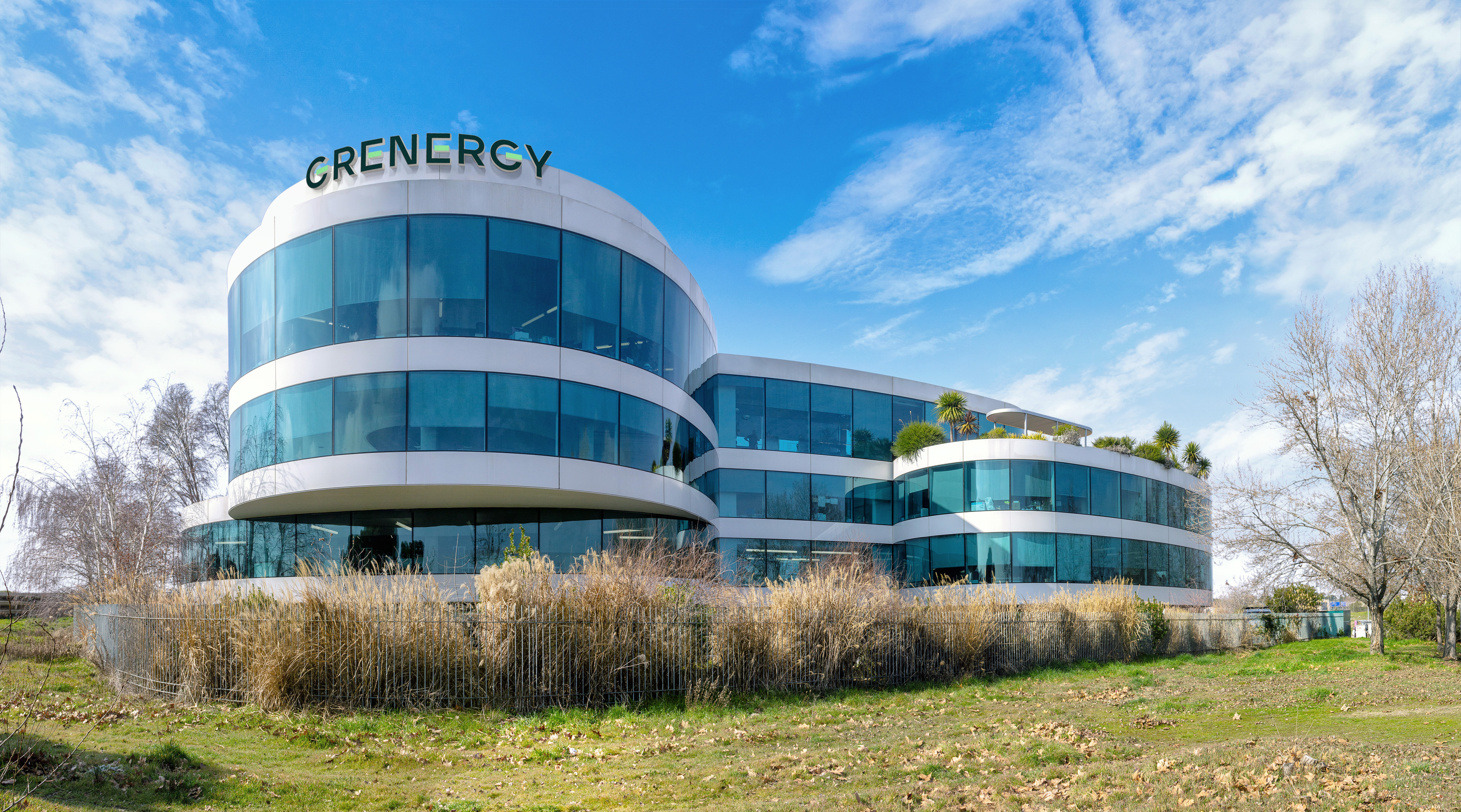
- Company type: public
- ISIN: ES0105079000
- Industry: Renewable Energy
- Founded: 2007
- Founder: David Ruiz de Andrés
- Headquarters: Madrid, Spain
- Area served: Europe, Latin America, United States
- Revenue: €400 M (2023)
- Number of employees: 600 (2023)
- Website: https://grenergy.eu/en/

Grenergy is a Spanish company founded in 2007. It is an independent renewable energy producer and a specialist in the development, construction and operation of photovoltaic and storage projects. It is present in 10 countries across Europe, Latin America and the United States. In 2023, with more than 600 employees, it posted a net profit of €51 million, a fivefold increase compared to 2022. In terms of total revenue, it rose to €400 million, 37% higher than in 2022.

== History ==
Grenergy was founded in Spain by economist David Ruiz de Andrés. It started its first projects in Spain (2008-2012) with solar farms in the provinces of Cuenca, Toledo, Sevilla, Granada and Ávila. The company chose Chile for its Latin American expansion, which began in 2014, after incentives for the sector were curbed in Spain.

In 2016, it was awarded the construction and development of two wind farms in Cajamarca (Peru), and continued with the construction of two solar plants in Colombia and Mexico.

It began operating in Italy, and the United Kingdom in 2020, and began operating in Germany in 2022. It entered the United States by acquiring a 40% stake in Sofos Harbert Renewable Energy, a photovoltaic and battery project developer. A year later, it succeeded in acquiring 100% of the company, which has been renamed Grenergy US.

=== IPO ===
In 2015, the company began trading on the Mercado Alternativo Bursátil (MAB - now known as BME Growth) of the Spanish Stock Exchange. In 2019, it made the jump to the continuous market. In 2021, the company registered its first green bond program, a debt issuance aligned with the International Capital Market Association's (ICMA) Green Bond Principles 2021 and the Loan Market Association's (LMA) Green Loan Principles 2021. The company signed the first green financing linked to sustainability in Spain with Banco Santander in 2023.

== Pipeline ==
It has a portfolio of 15.9 gigawatts (GW) of solar PV and 21.7 GWh of storage in various stages of development:

=== Oasis de Atacama ===
Located in the Atacama Desert (Chile), it is made up of 2 GW of solar and 11 gigawatt hours (GWh) of storage. In September 2024, Grenergy acquired a solar portfolio from Repsol and Ibereólica for $128m to expand the project. The portfolio included a 77MW photovoltaic plant, 923MW of projects under development and a 1GW interconnection facility.

Grenergy has an agreement with BYD - a Chinese battery manufacturer - to supply large-scale storage systems with a total capacity of 3 GWh. It has power purchase agreements with companies such as EMOAC in Chile.

In December 2024, Grenergy sold 23% of the assets from the projects to ContourGlobal for $962 million. The assets include 451 MW of solar and 2.5 GWh of storage.

=== GranTeno ===
It has a capacity of 241 MWp and is located in the Maule region, in south-central Chile. Its construction, with sustainable financing from BNP Paribas and Société Générale, amounted to 136 million euros ($148 million). A long-term Power Purchase Agreement (PPA) signed with an international utility company will provide 140 GWh per year for 12 years. It is Grenergy's largest PV plant in operation to date (2024).

=== Other projects ===
The portfolio includes the Escuderos photovoltaic plant (Cuenca). It has a capacity of 200 MW and will supply energy to Galp. With financing from KFW and Bankinter, the company secured 110 million euros for the construction.

The Tabernas Plant (Almería), with a capacity of 250 MW and an estimated annual production of 466.6 GWh, will sell its energy to Amazon. It is operating with green financing of 175 million euros. In addition, it has signed an agreement with Ingeteam for the supply of 70 state-of-the-art inverters.

There are another 80 Grenergy photovoltaic plants in Chile.
