= Punjab Renewable Energy Systems =

Indian biomass-based renewable energy company

Punjab Renewable Energy Systems Pvt. Ltd. (PRESPL)
- Type: Private
- Industry: Biomass & Renewable Energy
- Founded: 24 March 2011; 15 years ago
- Founder: Vini Ahuja; Monish Ahuja
- Headquarters: Mumbai, New Delhi
- Area served: India
- Key people: Monish Ahuja (Promoter & MD); Rohit Dev (COO)
- Products: Biofuel
- Website: prespl.com

Punjab Renewable Energy Systems Pvt. Ltd. (PRESPL) is an Indian biomass-based renewable energy company involved in biomass aggregation and supply chain management. The company provides fuel to biomass power plants, independent power producers (IPPs) and process industries generating power to run their operations. This process is done by burning biomass to produce heat, steam and electricity.
