= OMC Power =

Distributed energy company in Haryana, India

- Company type: Private Limited
- Industry: Distributed Energy, Solar Power
- Founded: 2011
- Founder: Rohit Chandra, Sushil Jiwarajka, and Anil Raj
- Headquarters: Gurgaon, India
- Area served: India
- Key people: Rohit Chandra (Managing Director & CEO)
- Website: www.omcpower.com

OMC Power is a distributed energy company headquartered in Gurgaon, Haryana, India.

It develops solar-powered microgrids and decentralized clean energy systems, primarily across rural areas of Uttar Pradesh, India.

== History ==
OMC Power was founded in 2011 by Rohit Chandra, Sushil Jiwarajka, and Anil Raj with their own funds in Gurgaon, Haryana. Till 2024, The company has set up over 400 microgrids in eighteen districts of Uttar Pradesh, with capacities ranging from 36 to 50 kW.

In January 2015, OMC Power with other giants of Renewable energy signed a letter to Barack Obama to collaborate with Prime Minister Narendra Modi to develop a "Power India" initiative.

In 2016, The Rockefeller Foundation, an American private foundation and philanthropic medical research organization partnered with OMC Power for construction and setup of 100 minigrids and community activities in rural Uttar Pradesh, India.

In 2017, OMC Power collaborated with Japanese company Mitsui & Co..

In May 2022, Japanese company Chubu Electric Power bought some stake from OMC Power at an agreed cost of 5 billion yen ($39 million). And in November 2024, Chubu Electric expanded its investment in OMC Power to boost energy transition in India.

In December 2024, Jakson Group partnered with OMC Power for 50 MW solar projects worth 200 Cr.

In May 2025, OMC Power completed a Rs 200 crore solar rooftop funding with Aerem Solutions. And Honda's Clean Energy Storage partnered with OMC Power in October 2025.

In March 2026, Japan’s Kansai Transmission and Distribution acquired a 10% stake in OMC Power to develop 1 gigawatt (GW) of renewable energy capacity in India.

== Operations ==
OMC Power started its distributed energy operations in 2012 from rural areas of Indian state Uttar Pradesh. Till 2024 It is operational in 400 villages.

In 2023, OMC started a new vertical providing solar services in the Healthcare segment. It started with KGMU, Lucknow and has scaled up to 9 medical colleges with capacity of 1MW+ in Uttar Pradesh.

== Footnotes ==
- A Research & Analysis Report by GSMA
- Detailed Analysis & Rating Report by CRISIL
