= Sundog Solar =

American solar energy company

- Company type: Private
- Industry: Solar power
- Founded: 2006 Startup company
- Headquarters: Chatham, NY, USA
- Key people: Jody Rael, President & CEO
- Number of employees: Approx. 7
- Website: sundogsolar.net

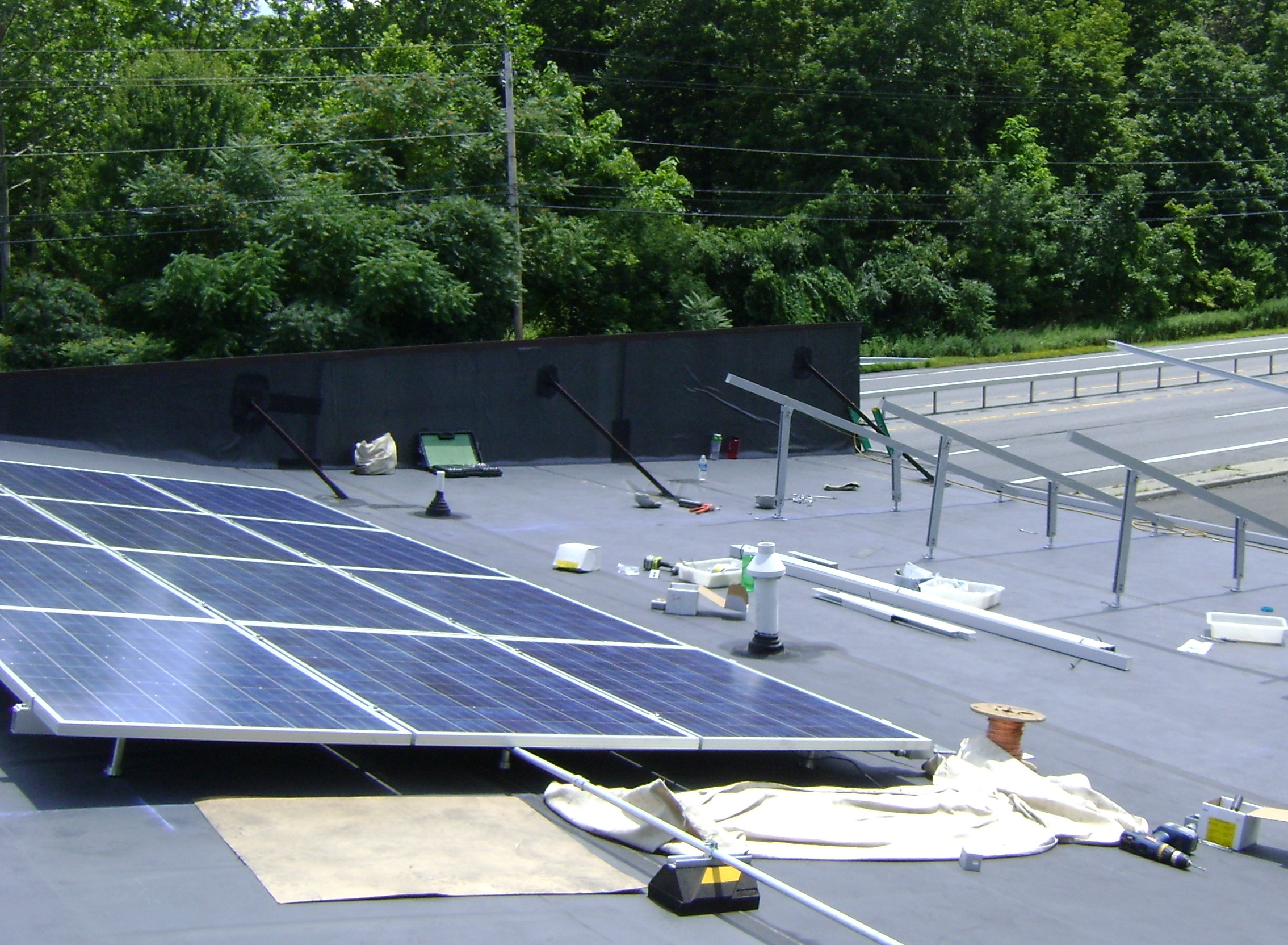
A photovoltaic installation near Poughkeepsie, New York

Sundog Solar is a solar energy installation company based in Chatham, NY, and Midcoast Maine in Searsport. Sundog installs photovoltaic and solar hot water systems on homes and businesses. The company also provides a spray foam insulation installation service.

== Facilities ==
Sundog is based out of a factory warehouse that is shared with Kling Magnetics. The building is part of a complex that used to be the Columbia Box Board Mill, and is powered by 37.6 kW photovoltaic system and heated with vegetable oil.

== History ==
In 1997, Sundog Solar's owner Jody Rael bought the Chatham property from the Columbia Box Board paper mill company. In 2007 the company invested $250,000 to make their 20,000 sq ft (1,900 m^{2}) manufacturing and office facility carbon-neutral.

== Media coverage ==
- The Register Star - SunDog Solar to take part in National Solar Tour for first time
- The Register Star - - Congressman Murphy presents SunDog Solar with $50K USDA grant
- NYInc - SunDog Solar Eliminates Upfront Solar Electric Costs In New Residential/Commercial/Nonprofit Program SunDog Solar Eliminates Upfront Solar Electric Costs in New Residential Commercial Nonprofit Program
- Green Real Estate Daily - Q&A: Jody Rael, owner and president of Solaqua Power and Art
- Berkshire Living - Green Zone
