= Mage Solar =

German solar energy company

Mage Solar AG
- Company type: Stock corporation
- Industry: Renewable Energy, Photovoltaics
- Founded: 2007
- Headquarters: Ravensburg, Germany
- Key people: Markus Feil (Spokesman), Norbert Philipp
- Revenue: 29 Mio. € (2010)
- Number of employees: 116 (2010)
- Website: www.magesolar.com

Mage Solar AG (German pronunciation: [ˈmaːɡe zoˈlaːɐ̯ ʔaːˈɡeː], stylized as MAGE SOLAR), headquartered in Ravensburg, Germany, provides system components for photovoltaic installations: poly- and monocrystalline photovoltaic modules, mounting systems, inverters as well as services such as installation planning.

== Structure ==
Mage Solar was established in 2007 as a limited company. In spring 2011 the company changed from being a limited company to a stock corporation. Mage Solar AG is a 100 per cent subsidiary of Mage Industrie Holding AG from Reutlingen and therefore part of the Mage Group, founded more than 35 years ago by Manfred Gehring. Mage Solar has a total of six subsidiaries in Germany and abroad. The company currently employs a workforce of 160 employees.

== International profile ==
Mage Solar is active in the US, Italy, France, Czech Republic, Turkey, China, Benelux countries, Spain, Slovakia, Great Britain, Greece, North Africa, Australia and Middle East. Together with its US American subsidiary, Mage Solar established a presence in Dublin, Georgia in the year 2010, where if founded a Solar Academy at the beginning of 2011 as a contribution to the development of photovoltaic education in the US and the American continent. In March 2011 the company began to manufacture modules at its US location.

Mage operates in multiple countries by exposing the German way of doing business, which is very tightly controlled and regimented. This have advantages but several disadvantages as it overrides the traditional methods of doing business in those countries.

Mage discontinued operations at its Dublin, Georgia location in 2013.

== Sponsoring ==
Since the beginning of the 2011-12 Bundesliga season Mage Solar supports the German soccer club SC Freiburg as premium partner and since January 2012 the Freiburg soccer stadium officially has been named Mage Solar stadium. Since the beginning of the year 2012 the company expanded its sponsoring activities internationally and supports the Belgian soccer club RSC Anderlecht as premium partner since then.
