= Titan Wind Energy =

Chinese energy provider

- Company type: Public
- Industry: Renewable energy
- Headquarters: Taicang, Jiangsu, China
- Key people: Yan Junxu, Chairman, President
- Products: Wind Towers
- Revenue: ▲$498 million U.S. (2020)
- Net income: $84,002 million U.S. (2020)
- Number of employees: 2483 (Worldwide/2021)
- Parent: Titan Wind Energy
- Website: www.titanwind.com.cn

Titan Wind Energy (Suzhou) Co., Ltd. is a Chinese energy provider founded in 2005 and listed on the Shenzhen stock exchange on December 31, 2010, stock code: 002531. The company adheres to the development of wind power industry chain upstream and downstream, and it is mainly engaged in the production and sale of wind turbines, blades and other wind power generation equipment, as well as the development and operation of clean energy.

== History ==
The company was founded in 2005 with an initial production facility in Taicang (Suzhou). Since then Titan has expanded with three factories, located in China along with facilities in Europe.

In 2012 Titan bought wind tower production facilities from the Danish company Vestas located in Varde, Denmark.

In 2014: Titan Wind Energy (Europe) A/S acquires Gardit Surface Treatment in Esbjerg, Denmark.

In 2019 Titan Wind acquired the Ambau plant in the German town of Cuxhaven to make offshore wind turbine foundations.
