= Puxin Biogas =

Puxin Biogas Digester or Puxin Biogas Plant is product of Shenzhen Puxin Science & Technology Co. Ltd. based in Shenzhen, People's Republic of China. The company was founded in November 2002. Its business is new energy and environmental protection.

== Activities ==
The company's main business is:

1. Design and build large and medium-sized biogas projects.
2. Develop, manufacture and sell products needed to build family-size biogas system.
3. Develop, manufacture and sell new style small size biogas digesters.

== Accomplishments ==
- United Nations' 2006 BlueSky Award
- 23 years development of patented technology; the main inventor has PhD from McGill University, Canada
- Products sold to over 41 countries

== Examples ==
Puxin biogas digesters built in Kenya.

=== Tiwi, Kenya ===
TN P/2 Biogas System at Kenya Bixa Ltd, Tiwi, Kenya 2-stage-biogas-system consisting of:

- six 20 cubic meter Puxin biogas digester
- one 26 cubic meter overflow pit
- six hydrolysis pits
- two gas bags for storage of biogas 98 cubic meters and 36 cubic meters

Designed for a daily feedstock of 10 tons of bio waste (seeds, chicken and slaughterhouse waste). With daily 2 tons of annatto seeds, the 6 digesters produce daily about 180 cubic meters of biogas. Biogas is used to run a steam boiler, run dryers. It can also burn diesel and firewood.

=== Bamburi, Mombasa ===
TN P/2 Biogas System at Mombasa Go-Kart, Bamburi, Mombasa 2-stage-biogas-system consisting of:

- one 12 cubic meter Puxin biogas digester
- three 1 cubic meter hydrolysis pits

Daily feedstock: 70 – 100 kg kitchen waste. Daily biogas production about 7 cubic meters. The excess biogas that is not consumed is stored in a gas bag. Biogas is used to replace LPG in the restaurant and private houses.

=== Kikambala, Kenya ===
TN P/2 Biogas System at Sun 'n' Sand Beach Resort, Kikambala, Kenya 2-stage-biogas-system consisting of:

- one 14 cubic meter Puxin biogas digester
- two 4 cubic meter hydrolysis pits.

Designed for a daily feedstock of 400 kg of bio waste (kitchen and garden). Biogas is used to replace LPG and charcoal in the staff canteen.
