= T. J. Rodgers =

American scientist and entrepreneur (born 1948)

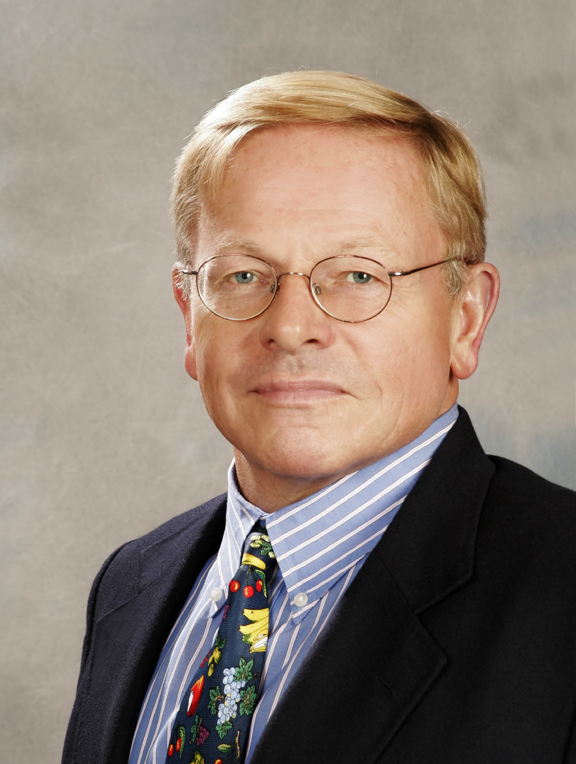
- 2007 portrait
- Born: Thurman John Rodgers; March 15, 1948 (age 78); Oshkosh, Wisconsin, U.S.
- Education: Dartmouth College, 1970 B.A. Stanford University, 1973 M.A. 1975 Ph.D.
- Occupations: Scientist and entrepreneur
- Spouse: Valeta Massey

Thurman John Rodgers (born March 15, 1948) is an American billionaire scientist and entrepreneur. He is the founder of Cypress Semiconductor and holds patents ranging from semiconductors to energy to winemaking. Rodgers is known for his public relations acumen, brash personality, and strong advocacy of laissez-faire capitalism. He stepped down as Cypress CEO in April 2016 and Director in August 2016 after serving for 34 years.

== Early life ==
Thurman John Rodgers was born on March 15, 1948, in Oshkosh, Wisconsin. He goes back to nearby Green Bay, Wisconsin several times a year to attend Green Bay Packers football games. His father was a car salesman and worked for General Motors and his mother was a school teacher, with a master's degree in radio electronics. He was a Sloan scholar at Dartmouth College and played on the Dartmouth Big Green football team. In 1970 he received his bachelor's degree, graduating as salutatorian with majors in chemistry and physics. He received his master's degree (1973) and Ph.D. (1975) in electrical engineering from Stanford University. While pursuing his Ph.D. degree, Rodgers invented the VMOS process technology, which he later licensed to American Microsystems, Inc. He founded Cypress Semiconductor in 1982. He was awarded an honorary doctorate from the Universidad Francisco Marroquín in Guatemala City.

== Career ==
After finishing a doctorate at Stanford, he turned down a job offer from Intel, saying that CEO Andrew S. Grove was unlikely to give him the freedom to pursue his own projects. Instead Rodgers accepted a job at American Microsystems, Inc. (AMI), where he continued development of VMOS, but this project was a failure.

=== Cypress Semiconductor ===
Rodgers founded Cypress Semiconductor in 1982 and served as founding CEO. Cypress is a semiconductor design and manufacturing company, producing PSoCs, microcontroller, IoT, wireless and USB, PMICs, memory and sensor chips. As CEO, Rodgers was responsible for more than 30 acquisitions, including SunPower and the IoT portfolio of Broadcom Corporation. Cypress also benefited from its business with Apple Inc., as its PSoC was behind the iPod click wheel. He stepped down as CEO in April 2016. In 2015, Cypress had more than 6,000 employees and revenues of US$1.6 billion. The company had about 7,000 issued patents and about 1,200 additional patent applications on record.

==== Proxy fight ====
In 2017 Rodgers conducted a successful proxy fight against Cypress. He raised concerns pertaining to director compensation, state-sponsored foreign competition as well as inherent conflicts of interest. After filing a lawsuit against the company in April 2017, Rodgers sought to remove executive chairman Ray Bingham and Éric Benhamou from the Cypress board and nominated Dan McCranie and Camillo Martino as directors. Rodgers argued that Bingham's role as a co-founder of Canyon Bridge, a private equity fund supported by the Government of China, constituted a clear conflict of interest as acquisition targets for both companies overlapped. Bingham was forced to resign from the Cypress board in early June 2017 and both of Rodgers' nominees won the subsequent 2017 shareholder election against Benhamou.

=== SunPower ===
Rodgers early recognized the value of high efficiency solar cells produced by SunPower. As SunPower faced financial problems in 2001, Rodgers tried to convince the Cypress board to buy the solar cell producer. Rodgers and SunPower CEO Richard Swanson had met in the 70s at Stanford University. But as the Cypress board of directors was not interested in saving the struggling company Rodgers wrote a check himself for $750,000. About a year later Rodgers had convinced the board to invest $9 million in SunPower and a few months later Cypress bought a majority stake in SunPower. In 2005 SunPower went public and reached a market capitalization of $10.4 billion in 2007. From May 2002 to May 2011, Rodgers served as chairman of SunPower.

In 2024 SunPower declared bankruptcy and TJ Rodger's company Complete Solar entered into a stalking horse bid on particular assets of the SunPower company including the company Name and stock ticker. In 2025 the company has branded back to SunPower where TJ serves as chairman of the board and CEO.

=== Enphase Energy ===
In January 2017, Rodgers invested US$5 million in Enphase Energy, a renewable energy firm specialized in energy management and the production of solar micro-inverters, which transform solar energy to alternating current for the electrical grid. In addition to his investment, Rodgers joined Enphase's board of directors.

=== Board memberships ===
- Bloom Energy, a fuel cell producer
- Enovix, producer of silicon lithium-ion batteries
- Enphase Energy, energy technology company
- Complete Solaria, a vertically integrated residential solar company
- FarmX, precision agriculture company
- FTC Solar, a renewable energy company
- Bespoken Spirits Inc., a beverage technology company

Rodgers also served as director of the Semiconductor Industry Association.

== Trustee of Dartmouth College ==
After successfully launching a petition drive to get his name on the ballot, Rodgers won the alumni trustee election of Dartmouth College in 2004, becoming the first successful petition candidate since 1980. He won with a comfortable margin. As trustee, Rodgers’ major concerns were removing the College's speech code, increasing the budget for teacher salaries and strengthening Dartmouth's focus on undergraduate education. Following the campaign of Rodgers, three additional independent trustees were elected in 2005 and 2007. Rodgers was reelected as trustee in 2009.

== Clos de la Tech ==
Rodgers began winemaking in 1996 on a one-acre vineyard surrounding his house in Woodside. Later he bought two additional vineyards and, along with his wife Valeta, Rodgers established the winery Clos de la Tech in the Santa Cruz Mountains of Silicon Valley. Clos de la Tech uses old French winemaking techniques of Domaine de la Romanée-Conti to make five Pinot Noir wines. This includes stomping the grapes with feet and siphoning the wine by hand. Also, no mechanized pumps are used. Clos de la Tech combines these old techniques with high tech monitoring and measures to optimize the conditions for the crops and to handle grapes and wine as gently as possible. Clos de la Tech's Pinot Noirs have been rated up to 96 points by Wine Enthusiast Magazine. As winemaker, Rodgers invented a patented wine press and computer monitored fermenters. He also designed and built the first wireless wine fermentation network, comprising 152 fermenters, and donated the system worth US$3.5 million to the UC Davis winery.

== Comments on diversity ==
In 1996, Rodgers received a form letter from Sister Doris Gormley, the Director of Corporate Social Responsibility for The Sisters of St. Francis of Philadelphia, encouraging him to hire women and minorities on the Cypress board. He replied with a long letter defending his hiring practices and philosophy. This exchange between Rodgers and Gormley drew considerable media attention. In 1999, he wrote an editorial in the San Jose Mercury News denouncing Jesse Jackson's attack on Cypress Semiconductor on what Jackson claimed was discriminatory hiring practices.

== Personal life ==
Rodgers is an avid jogger and wine enthusiast. He is a supporter of several charities, including Second Harvest of Silicon Valley, and served as a trustee on the Dartmouth College Board of Trustees from 2004 to 2012. He is the husband of Valeta Massey.

== Awards and recognition ==
1986:

- Entrepreneur of the Year by City of Santa Clara, California

1988:

- ENCORE (Entrepreneurial Company of the Year) Award from the Stanford University Business School

1996:

- "CEO of the year" – Financial World

1997

- Outstanding Individual Entrepreneurship Award from the U.S. Association for Small Business and Entrepreneurship

2000:

- Award from the Healing Institute for his support of the Carver Scholars Program

2001:

- Cited as one of the "100 People Who Changed Our World." by Upside
- Silicon Valley Capitalism Award for "exemplifying the virtues of capitalism and defending capitalism with ethical principles in the media."
- Angel Award by the International Angel Investors organization for his venture-capital activities supporting the semiconductor industry
- Entrepreneur of the Year Award from the Smith Center for Private Enterprise Studies at California State University, Hayward

2002:

- "Top 100 Chief Executives" by Chief Executive

2005 :

- Inducted into the Silicon Valley Engineering Council Hall of Fame.

2006:

- Honored with a Fellow Award from the International Engineering Consortium.

2009:

- Spirit of Ireland Award

== Patents ==
1975
US3878552 – Bipolar Integrated Circuit and Method
US3924265 – Low capacitance V groove MOS NOR gate and method of manufacture

1976
US3975221 – Low capacitance V groove MOS NOR gate and method of manufacture

1980
US4222063 – VMOS Floating gate memory with breakdown voltage loweringregion
US4222062 – VMOS Floating gate memory device

1981
CA1115426 – U-groove mos device

1988
US5835401 – DRAM with hidden refresh
US4764248 – Rapid thermal nitridized oxide locos process

1999
US5977638 – Edge metal for interconnect layers

2000
US6131140 – Integrated cache memory with system control logic and adaptation of RAM bus to a cache pinout

2001
US6185126 – Self-initializing RAM-based programmable device

2004
US6835616 – Method of forming a floating metal structure in an integratedcircuit
US6730545 – Method of performing back-end manufacturing of an integrated circuit device
US2004076712 – Fermentation tank wine press

2005
US6903002 – Low-k dielectric layer with air gaps
US6847218 – Probe card with an adapter layer for testing integrated circuits

2006
US7045387 – Method of performing back-end manufacturing of an integrated circuit

2007
US7227804 – Current source architecture for memory device standby current reduction

2008
US2008315847 – Programmable floating gate reference
US2008102160 – Wine-making press

2009
US7507944 – Non-planar packaging of image sensor

2017
US9624094 – Hydrogen barriers in a copper interconnect process

== Bibliography ==
- T. J. Rodgers; William Taylor; Rick Foreman (1993). No-Excuses Management: Proven Systems for Starting Fast, Growing Quickly, and Surviving Hard Times. Bantam Dell. ISBN 978-0-385-42604-6.

== See also ==
- Milton Friedman – Nobel Prize-winning economist, debated Rodgers and Mackey
- John Mackey – founder of Whole Foods Market, debated Rodgers and Friedman
