= Balcony solar power =

Small photovoltaic system connected directly to a building's electrical circuit

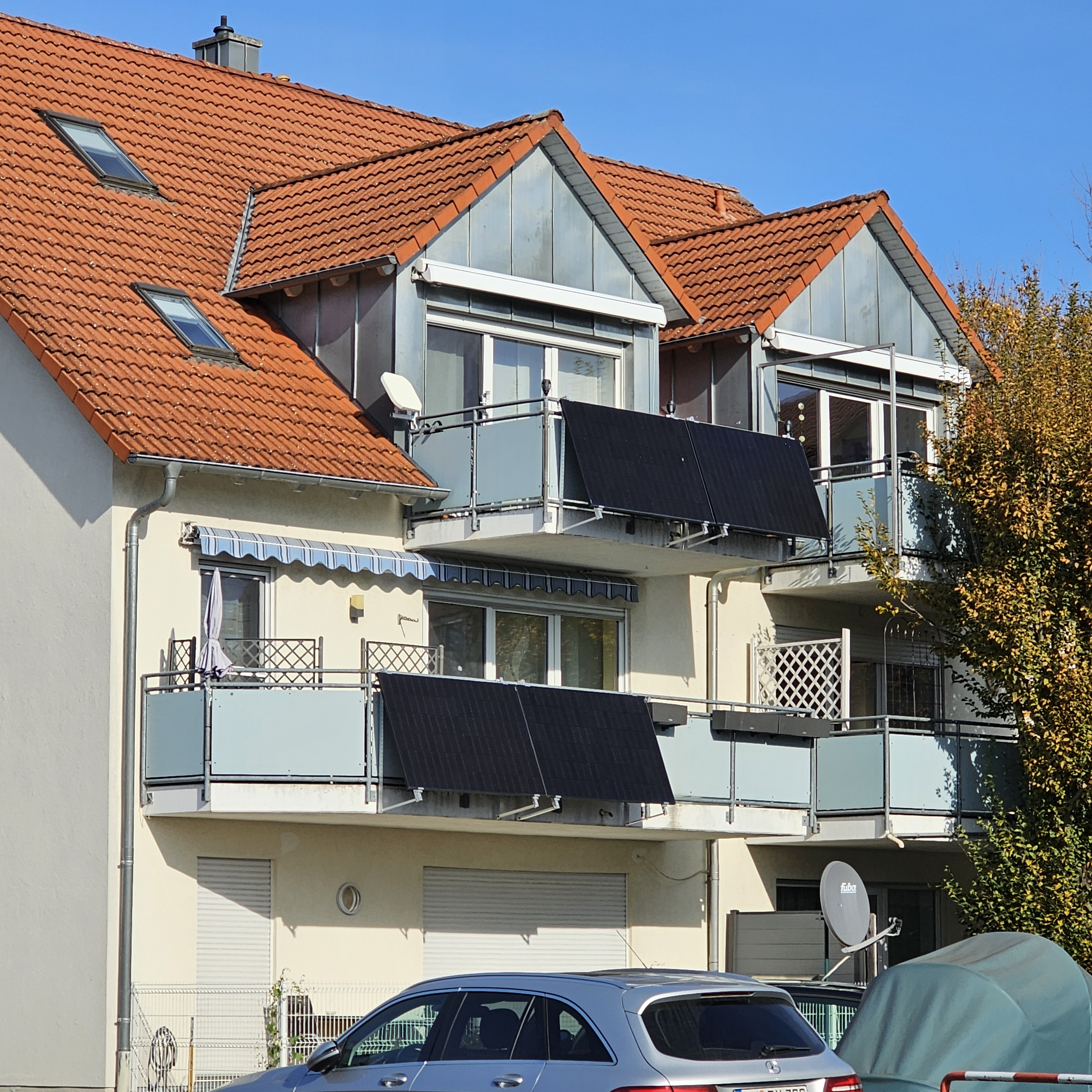
Solar panels installed on balconies in Germany.

A balcony solar power system (also called a plug-in solar panel, mini solar system, Plug-in PV, PIPV, or balcony power station) is a small photovoltaic system designed to generate electricity for direct use in a home or apartment. Unlike conventional rooftop solar installations, balcony solar systems connect to the existing electrical circuit of a building through a standard power outlet or dedicated socket, without requiring significant structural modifications or professional installation in most configurations.

A typical system consists of one or two solar modules, a microinverter or plug-in inverter, a low-voltage connection cable, and a plug for connection to the building's electrical circuit. The electricity generated offsets consumption from the grid in real time, reducing the building's net energy draw and lowering electricity bills.

Balcony solar systems are particularly suited for renters, apartment dwellers, and homeowners who cannot or do not wish to install a conventional rooftop system. They are installed on balconies, terraces, flat rooftops, garden fences, and exterior walls.

Balcony solar power started in Germany where its adoption is now widespread, with more than 4 million units installed. Adoption is far behind in the United States, where only about half of the states have introduced or enacted legislation permitting plug-in solar systems as of 2026.

== Technical specifications ==
=== Components ===
A standard balcony solar power system includes:

- One or two photovoltaic modules, typically with a combined output between 200 W and 1,600 W
- A plug-in microinverter that converts direct current (DC) output from the solar panels to alternating current (AC) compatible with the building's electrical system
- A connection cable with a country-specific plug (such as a Schuko plug in Germany or a standard NEMA 5-15 outlet in the United States)

=== Output and sizing ===
System output varies by country and regulatory framework. In Germany, the standard permits output up to 800 watts following a regulatory update in May 2024, raised from a prior limit of 600 watts. In the United States, proposed and enacted state laws generally permit systems up to 1,920 watts, with a common lower tier of approximately 400 watts that qualifies for simplified installation without a licensed electrician.

=== Safety standards ===
In the United States, the widely adopted National Electrical Code has specifications but these specifications assume the only source of power come from outside the protected circuit. Balcony solar power back-feeds a receptacle within the circuit and the NEC standard does not apply to this case. Plug-in inverters with UL 1741 certification are designed to automatically shut down during grid outages, preventing backfeed that could endanger electrical workers. Underwriters Laboratories (UL) is developing standards specifically for plug-in solar devices, establishing safety specifications for a balcony solar power panel using a UL defined receptacle.

In Germany, systems must comply with VDE V 0126-95, the German technical standard governing plug-in solar devices.

== History ==
Balcony solar power systems emerged in Europe in the early 2010s, initially as a niche product for technically-inclined consumers seeking to generate a portion of their own electricity without a full rooftop installation. Germany became the dominant early market, driven by high retail electricity prices and strong public interest in renewable energy following the Energiewende policy.

German installations doubled from the beginning of 2024 to 700,000 by October 2024, with total estimated installations reaching approximately four million by 2025.

== Market adoption ==
=== Germany ===
Germany is the world's leading market for balcony solar power,. Growth accelerated significantly after 2022, when European energy prices rose sharply following the Russian invasion of Ukraine. The German government simplified the regulatory framework for these systems in 2024, raising the permitted output limit to 800 watts and streamlining the registration process. No safety incidents attributable to balcony solar systems used as directed had been reported in Germany as of 2025.

=== United Kingdom ===
A regulation update in the UK on 27 August 2026 legalised the purchase and installation of balcony solar equipment up to 800W AC microinverter output.

There were more safety considerations for the UK, in part due to the common use of dual socket outlets rather than the single socket outlet common in the rest of Europe. Dual sockets increase the risk of overdriving the outlet with too much power. In March 2026, the UK government indicated that plug-in solar would be available within months.

=== United States ===
The United States represents a significant potential market for balcony solar power. A 2023 analysis estimated potential US capacity at 57 GW if plug-in solar were widely adopted. The technology is not explicitly illegal, but only ten states have passed laws making it legal: Utah, Maryland, Connecticut,Virginia, Vermont, Maine, New Hampshire, Colorado, New Jersey and California.

The California-based nonprofit Bright Saver has started selling DIY kits to members, hoping to become the Costco of balcony solar systems. Their initial systems require complex profession setup but their plan is to evolve the solution to remove complexity. In 2026, they began offering 180W units for less than $300.

=== Australia ===
Despite around a third of the Australian population having solar roof panels, it is still illegal to install plug-in solar panels or batteries. As of September 2026, the federal government is considering legislation that will allow both, giving access to these technologies to renters and apartment-dwellers.

== Benefits and limitations ==
=== Benefits ===
- Accessible to renters and apartment dwellers who cannot install conventional rooftop solar
- Lower upfront cost than full rooftop systems (typically $300–$1,500 for a complete plug-in kit)
- No structural modifications required in most configurations
- Portable—can be moved when a tenant relocates
- Immediate offset of electricity consumption, reducing grid draw in real time

=== Limitations ===
- Output is limited compared to full rooftop systems; a 400-watt plug-in system typically offsets 10–20% of average household electricity consumption
- Dependent on orientation and shading of available mounting surfaces
- Regulatory uncertainty persists in many US states and jurisdictions

== Environmental impact ==
Balcony solar power systems generate electricity with no direct greenhouse gas emissions during operation. Because they offset grid consumption in real time, their emissions benefit depends on the carbon intensity of the local electricity grid. In regions with coal-heavy generation, the offset benefit is larger; in regions with already low-carbon grids, the marginal benefit is smaller.

The systems' small scale and lower material requirements compared to full rooftop installations result in a shorter payback period—typically one to three years depending on local irradiance and system size.

== Safety and Risks in the United States ==
Three concerns have been identified as potential fire or safety risks in the United States: touch-safe plugs, bidirectional GFCI receptacles, and breaker-masking. The Underwriter Laboratory has proposed mitigations for these hazards and published UL 3700, a standard for plugin solar systems that requires the installation of a specific receptacle not currently part of the NEMA standards for receptacles.

=== Touch safe plugs ===
Balcony solar systems (panels plus microinverter) deliver power via a standard household plug. Such plugs in the US are not designed for this purpose. Inverters for rooftop use are required to cut output to the plug within 2 seconds. If a balcony device used similar technology, the plugs would not be considered touch safe.

A UL 3700 certified solar device would use a special plug and matching receptacle to avoid this hazard. However this requires the modification of the user's electrical circuit to install the special receptacle.

=== Ground fault circuit interrupters ===
Ground fault circuit interrupters (GFCI) are a safety device that opens a circuit if the device detects a path in the circuit to ground. While required in the US if any part of the circuit will be near a wet area like a bathroom, the GFCI devices are not tested for use with bidirectional current.

=== Overcurrent protection challenges ===
Balcony solar microinverters inject additional AC electrical current into the household wiring, current that does not pass through the circuit breaker protecting that wiring. The effect is called breaker masking or overcurrent protection challenges. If the wiring circuit allows multiple devices to plug in and if a balcony solar device is on the circuit between the breaker and other devices with large current draws, the circuit breaker will only sense the current drawn by the other devices and not the current injected by the balcony solar microinverters. In this scenario the total current on the household wires could exceed the safe limit, as specified in the National Electrical Code (NEC).

In Germany and the UK, the breaker-masking issue is mitigated by restricting owner-installed balcony solar microinverter energy production to 800W AC. For German and UK 230V and 16A household wiring, 800W AC corresponds to a maximum over-current potential of approximately 3.5A (800 divided by 230), which is approximately 22% over the breaker limit of 16A. This 22% limit has been shown to be safe in Germany. Power production greater than 800W AC per dwelling requires professional installation.

Similar analysis does not directly apply to the US. The standard US circuit runs at 120V, so the 22% over-current restriction in place in Germany and UK would limited balcony solar to 400W AC.

== See also ==
- Solar power
- Photovoltaic system
- Net metering
- Microinverter
- Distributed generation
- Solar power in Germany
- Solar power in the United States
- Energiewende
