= Aptera (solar electric vehicle) =

American solar electric 3-wheel vehicle

Aptera Solar EV
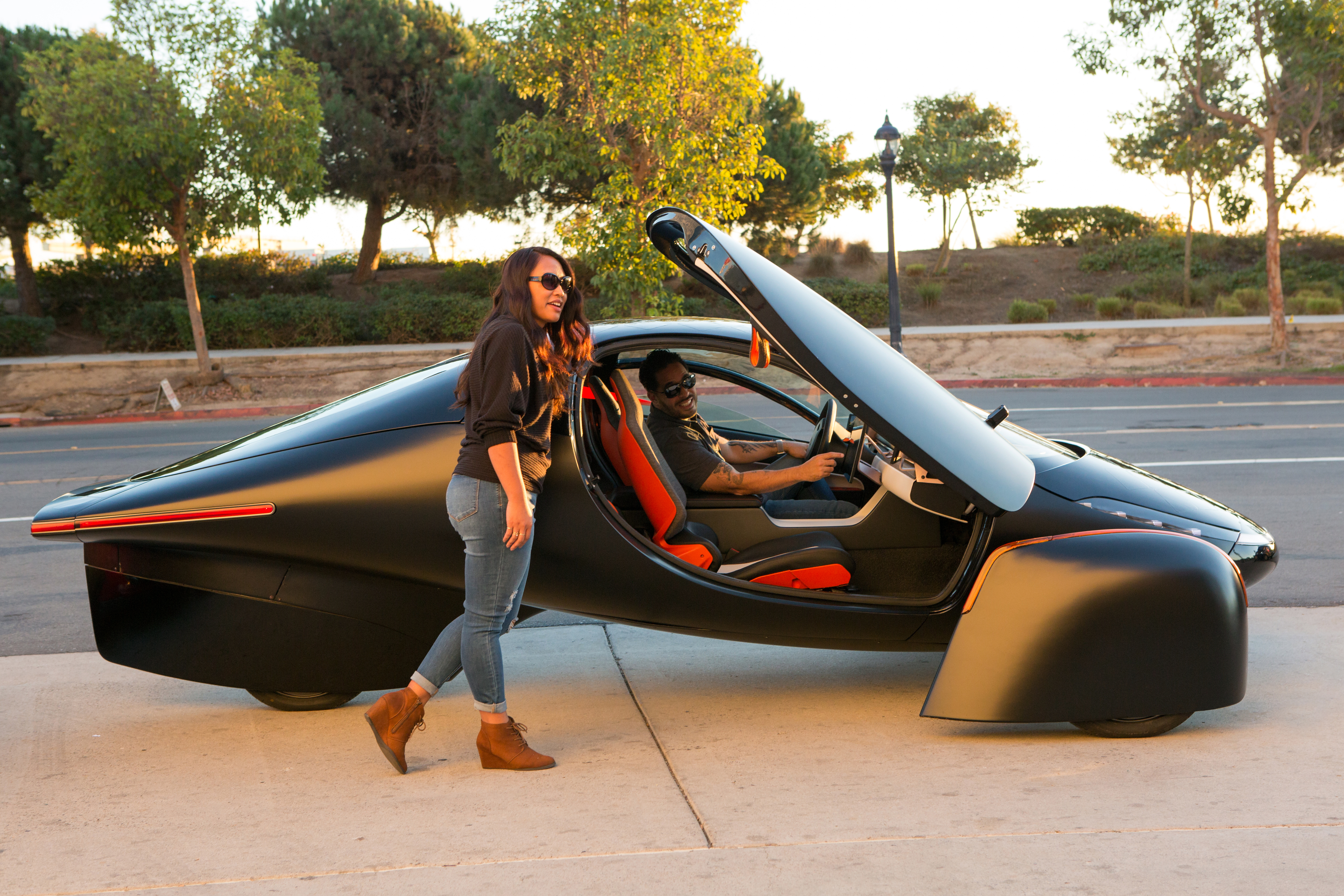
- First prototype of the Aptera solar powered EV

Overview
- Manufacturer: Aptera Motors
- Production: 2026 (pending funding)
- Assembly: Carlsbad, California
- Designer: Jason Hill

Body and chassis
- Class: Three-wheeler; Motorcycle; Sports car
- Body style: 3 door hatchback coupé
- Layout: front-wheel drive

Powertrain
- Electric motor: Vitesco Technologies EMR3 axle drive
- Battery: 25, 44, 60 or 100 kW·h lithium-ion
- Range: 250, 400, 600 or 1,000 miles (1,600 km) EPA
- Plug-in charging: NACS (Tesla) connector; 50 kW DC

Dimensions
- Wheelbase: 2,743 mm (108 in)
- Length: 4,496 mm (177 in)
- Width: 2,225 mm (87.6 in)
- Height: 1,422 mm (56 in)
- Curb weight: 998 kg (2,200 lb) for the 44 kWh Launch Edition

Chronology
- Predecessor: Aptera 2 Series (never produced)

Aptera is a two-seat three-wheeler electric solar vehicle under development by Aptera Motors. Earlier versions of similar vehicles have been under development starting in 2006. The design has an aerodynamic shape and uses lightweight carbon fiber and fiberglass composite materials, and built-in solar cells to extend its range by up to 64 km (40 mi) per day. While early prototypes featured in-wheel motors, the 2024 design has a single standard front-wheel drive motor.

== Development ==
Aptera Motors started development of the solar electric version of the vehicle in 2019 following earlier development and commercialization attempts since 2006. Aptera announced in 2019 it plans for four stages of prototypes, with the third stage of prototypes nearing the final production design, and the fourth representing a prototype that's identical to production vehicles.

Aptera announced in June 2022 it plans to scale in-wheel motor production in Slovenia by Elaphe. Due to issues with getting the Aptera in-wheel motor design to production it was replaced in 2024 with a standard front-wheel drive axle design for the initial production model. Aptera named Maxeon Solar Technologies as the solar cell provider for the vehicle in October 2022. In March 2023, Aptera announced its use of Comma.ai's Openpilot driver assistance system. Aptera announced in November 2022 a design change to bodies made of molded chopped carbon fiber.

A prototype of the Aptera vehicle was shown at the January 2025 Consumer Electronics Show. The prototype shown at CES 2025 was "nearly" ready for production. The carbon-fiber and fiberglass panels of the vehicle were made with production tooling, however the diecast metal suspension arms and the injection-molded interior components were not.

== Production ==
The company planned to deliver production units of the solar electric vehicle in 2021. Aptera partnered in 2023 with Italian manufacturer CPC for production of the vehicle's molded carbon fiber parts. The company announced in 2024 it was raising funds for the initial phases of production. Company representatives said in January 2025 that initial customer deliveries were anticipated by the end of 2025. The company later announced in April 2025 initial sales are planned for late 2026 and full-scale production is planned for 2028 pending further funding.

In May of 2026, Aptera completed 5 validation prototypes to be used for testing major components of the vehicle. Later vehicles made on the low-volume validation assembly line are planned to be used for safety testing.

== Design ==
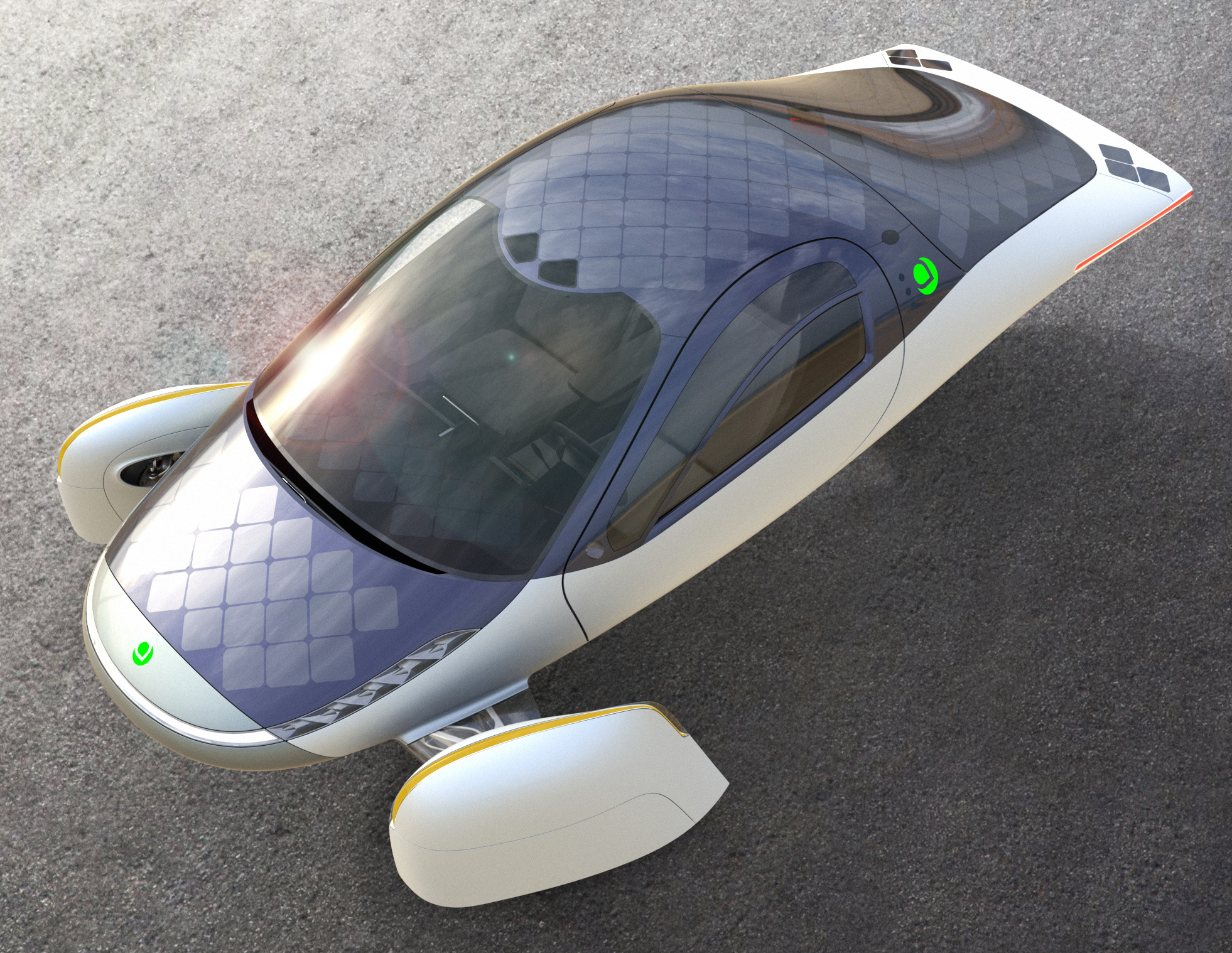
View of the solar panels throughout the vehicle

The Aptera's body shape is similar to earlier design exercises in efficiency, including the "Fusion" human-powered vehicle produced by the Pegasus Research Company in 1984, and the MIT Aztec Solar Car, which won multiple efficiency awards while racing in the American Tour de Sol in 1993. The Aptera has a claimed coefficient of drag that is very low, at 0.13 as of January 2023. The car was tested at an Italian wind tunnel, the results of which were not for engineering purposes.

In 2019 the 60 kWh battery version was expected to weigh about 820 kilograms (1,800 lb). As of 2026 the redesigned Launch Edition with a 44 kWh battery is estimated to weigh 1,000 kilograms (2,200 lb). It has a NACS compatible connector, and is estimated to charge at a rate of between 40 and 60 kW.
