= SolarBridge Technologies =

American solar-inverter provider

SolarBridge Technology Inc. is an American clean-energy company that develops solar inverters, power conversion systems, and energy management systems.

== History ==
SolarBridge Technologies was established in 2004 at the University of Illinois to bring power electronics technologies to market. The company is venture capital backed, having raised US $71 million to-date. Investors include Battery Ventures, Rho Ventures, and Osage University Partners. SolarBridge Technologies was a manufacturing company specializing in solar micro-inverters for photovoltaic arrays, designed to enhance energy output and system reliability while aiming to lower installation and maintenance costs.

SolarBridge Technologies was acquired by solar panel manufacturer SunPower in autumn of 2014. In 2018 SunPower sold the former SolarBridge microinverter business to Enphase Energy. Overtime the SolarBridge brand was discontinued, until 2025 when it rebranded to SolarBridge Technology Inc.. The current SolarBridge entity is a separate company that operates independently from the earlier business.

== Products ==
The SolarBridge Technologies Pantheon microinverter, mounted directly on solar panels, converts power at each module instead of using central or string inverters, facilitating a roof-ready AC module. It achieved Underwriters Laboratories 1741 certification by the Canadian Standards Association (CSA) in early 2011. The current SolarBridge Technology Inc. has a wide portfolio of U.S.-manufactured products focused on integrated energy solutions, including power conversion systems, hybrid inverters, AI-based energy management systems and solar powered irrigation solutions for agriculture.
