= Stand-alone power system =

Off-the-grid electricity system

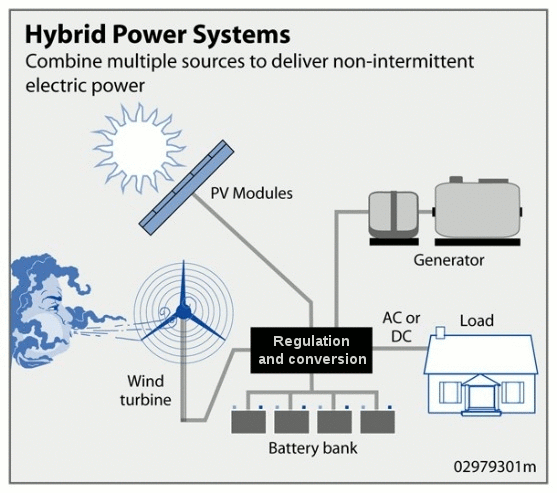
Schematics of a hybrid system

A stand-alone power system (SAPS or SPS), also known as remote area power supply (RAPS), is an off-the-grid electricity system for locations that are not fitted with an electricity distribution system. Typical SAPS include one or more methods of electricity generation, energy storage, and regulation.

Electricity is typically generated by one or more of the following methods:

- Photovoltaic system using solar panels
- Wind turbine
- Geothermal source
- Micro combined heat and power
- Micro hydro
- Diesel or biofuel generator
- Thermoelectric generator (TEGs)

Storage is typically implemented as a battery bank, but other solutions exist including fuel cells. Power drawn directly from the battery will be direct current extra-low voltage (DC ELV), and this is used especially for lighting as well as for DC appliances. An inverter is used to generate AC low voltage, which more typical appliances can be used with.

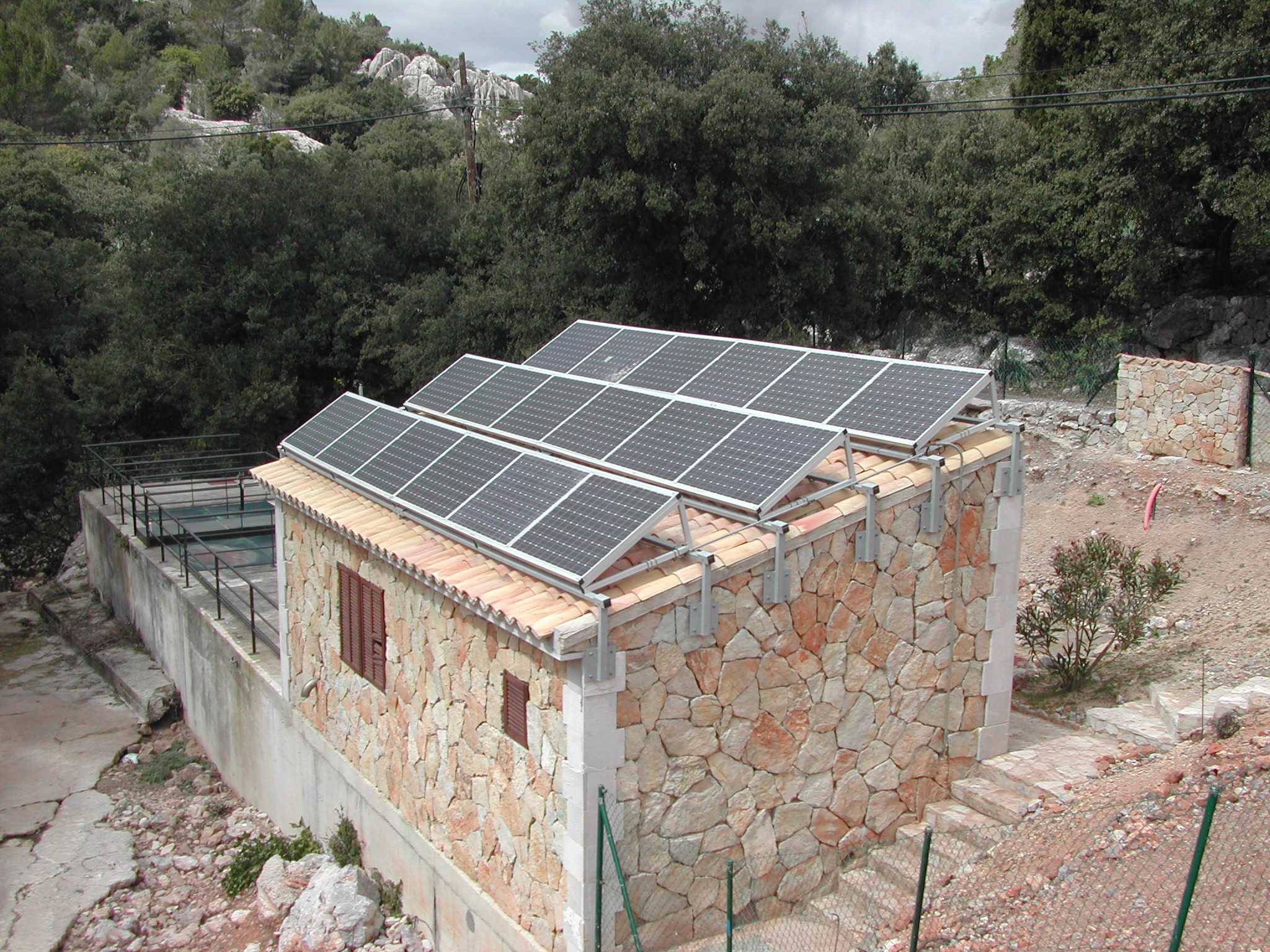
A typical stand-alone solar PV system at a sewage treatment plant in Santuari de Lluc, Spain

Stand-alone photovoltaic power systems are independent of the utility grid and may use solar panels only or may be used in conjunction with a diesel generator, a wind turbine or batteries.

== Types ==
The two types of stand-alone photovoltaic power systems are direct-coupled system without batteries and stand alone system with batteries.

=== Direct-coupled system ===
The basic model of a direct coupled system consists of a solar panel connected directly to a dc load. As there are no battery banks in this setup, energy is not stored and hence it is capable of powering common appliances like fans, pumps etc. only during the day. MPPTs are generally used to efficiently utilize the Sun's energy especially for electrical loads like positive-displacement water pumps. Impedance matching is also considered as a design criterion in direct-coupled systems.

=== Stand alone system with batteries ===
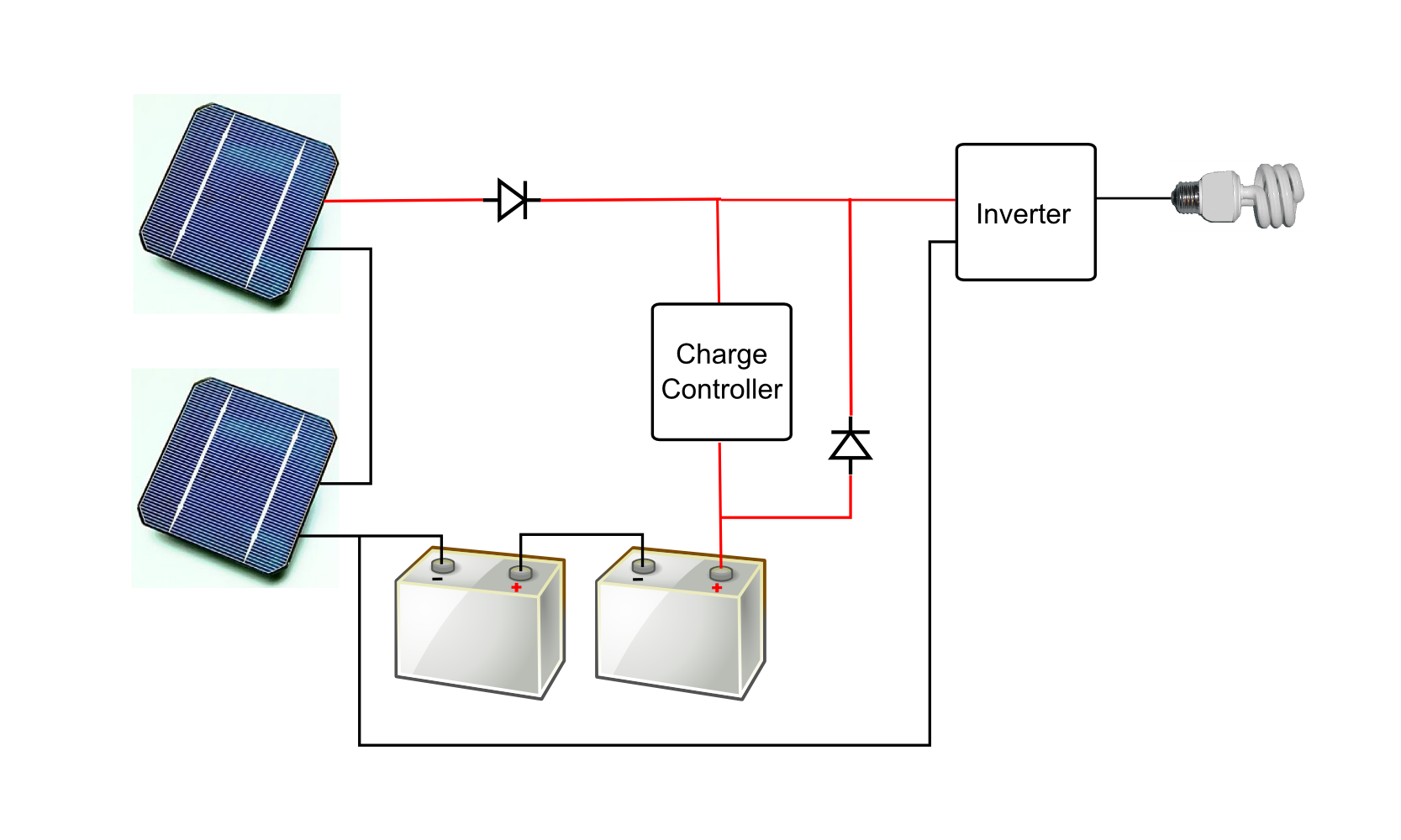
Schematic of a stand-alone PV system with battery and charger

In stand-alone photovoltaic power systems, the electrical energy produced by the photovoltaic panels cannot always be used directly. As the demand from the load does not always equal the solar panel capacity, battery banks are generally used. The primary functions of a storage battery in a stand-alone PV system are:

- Energy Storage Capacity and Autonomy: To store energy when there is an excess available and to provide it when required.
- Voltage and Current Stabilization: To provide stable current and voltage by eradicating transients.
- Supply Surge Currents: to provide surge currents to loads like motors when required.

== Hybrid system ==
The hybrid power plant is a complete electrical power supply system that can be easily configured to meet a broad range of remote power needs. There are three basic elements to the system - the power source, the battery, and the power management center. Sources for hybrid power include wind turbines, diesel engine generators, thermoelectric generators and solar PV systems. The battery allows autonomous operation by compensating for the difference between power production and use. The power management center regulates power production from each of the sources, controls power use by classifying loads, and protects the battery from service extremes.

== System monitoring ==
Monitoring photovoltaic systems can provide useful information about their operation and what should be done to improve performance, but if the data are not reported properly, the effort is wasted. To be helpful, a monitoring report must provide information on the relevant aspects of the operation in terms that are easily understood by a third party. Appropriate performance parameters need to be selected, and their values consistently updated with each new issue of the report. In some cases it may be beneficial to monitor the performance of individual components in order to refine and improve system performance, or be alerted to loss of performance in time for preventative action. For example, monitoring battery charge/discharge profiles will signal when replacement is due before downtime from system failure is experienced.

=== IEC standard 61724 ===
IEC has provided a set of monitoring standards called the "Standard for Photovoltaic system performance monitoring" (IEC 61724). It focusses on the photovoltaic system's electrical performance and it does not address hybrids or prescribe a method for ensuring that performance assessments are equitable.

== Performance assessment ==
Performance assessment involves:

- Data collection, which is a straightforward process of measuring parameters.
- Evaluation of that data in a manner that provides useful information.
- Dissemination of useful information to the end user.

== Load related problems ==
The wide range of load related problems identified are classified into the following types:

- Wrong selection: Some loads cannot be used with stand-alone PV systems.
- House wiring: Inadequate or low quality wiring and protection devices can affect the system's response.
- Low efficiency: Low efficiency loads may increase energy consumption.
- Stand-by loads: Stand-by mode of some loads waste energy.
- Start-up: High current drawn by some loads during start-up Current spikes during the start-up can overload the system temporarily.
- Reactive power: The circulating current can differ from the current consumed when capacitive or inductive loads are used.
- Harmonic distortion: Non-linear loads may create distortion of the inverter waveform.
- Mismatch between load and inverter size: When a higher rated inverter is used for a lower capacity load, overall efficiency is reduced.

== Gallery ==
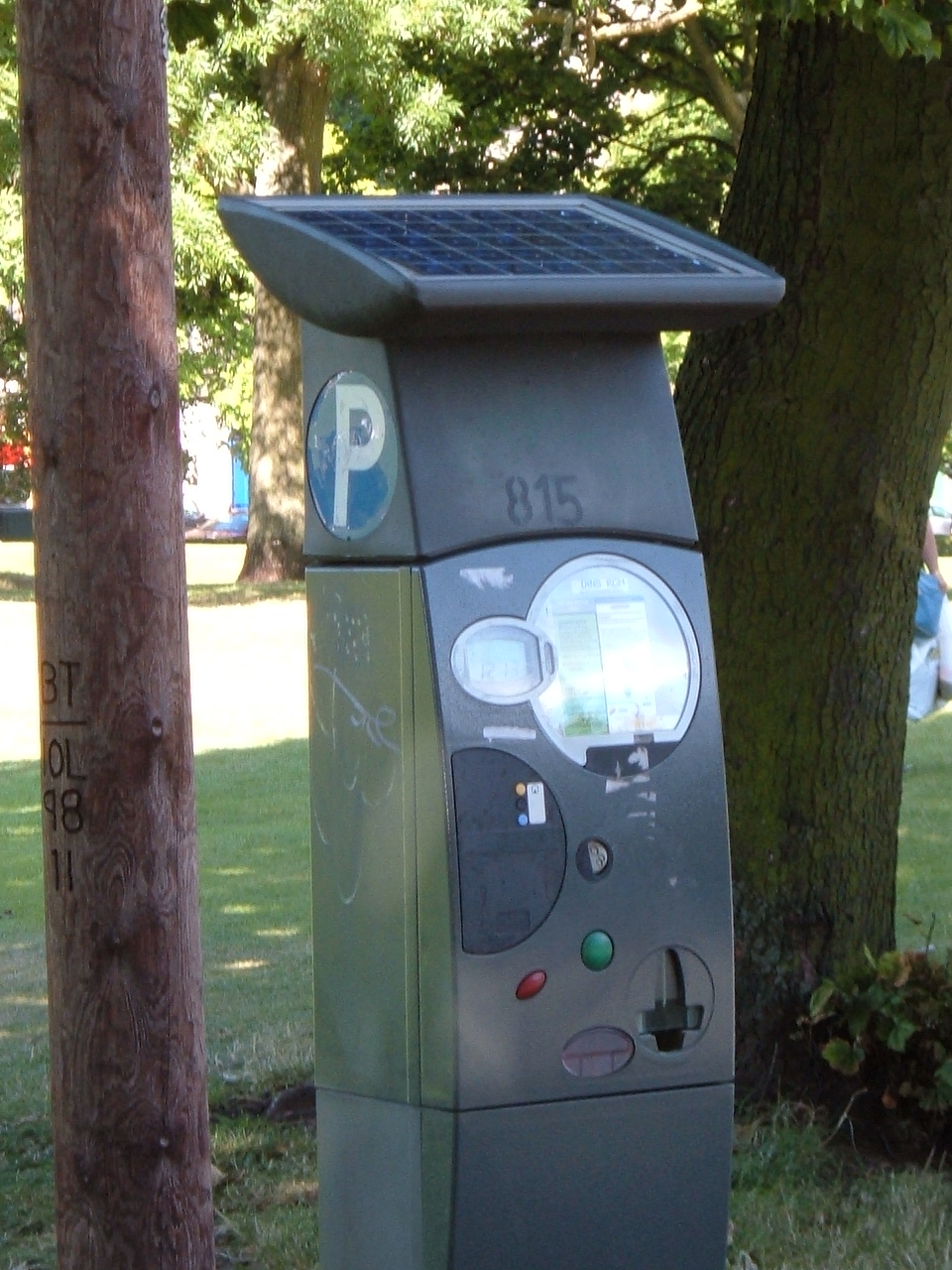
Solar powered parking meter

== See also ==
- Australian Greenhouse Office
- Building-integrated photovoltaics
- Distributed generation
- Electrochemical energy conversion
- Energy harvesting
- Grid-connected photovoltaic power system
- List of energy storage projects
- List of rooftop photovoltaic installations
- Microgeneration
- Off-the-grid
- Photovoltaic power plant
- Rural electricity
- Solar inverter
