= SunPower =

American solar energy company

SunPower Corporation
- Traded as: Nasdaq: SPWR
- Industry: Renewable energy
- Founded: 1985; 41 years ago
- Founder: Richard Swanson
- Headquarters: Richmond, California, United States
- Area served: United States and Canada
- Key people: Tom Werner (Principal Executive Officer)
- Revenue: ▲US$1,741 million (2022)
- Operating income: ▼US$(0.49) million (2022)
- Net income: ▲US$60.463 million (2022)
- Total assets: ▲US$1,780 million (2022)
- Total equity: ▲US$575 million (2022)
- Number of employees: 4,710 (2022)
- Parent: TotalEnergies (50.6%)
- Website: sunpower.com
- Footnotes; Financials as of December 31, 2022. References

SunPower Corporation is an American provider of photovoltaic solar energy generation systems and battery energy storage products, primarily for residential customers. The company, headquartered in San Jose, California, was founded in 1985 by Richard Swanson, an electrical engineering professor from Stanford University. Cypress Semiconductor bought a majority interest in the company in 2002, growing it quickly until SunPower went public in 2005. TotalEnergies, a French energy and oil company purchased a controlling interest in SunPower for US$1.37 billion in 2011 but disengaged progressively until reaching 32.5%.

The company previously developed and manufactured photovoltaic panels, before spinning off that part of its business in 2020 as Maxeon Solar Technologies. The company had also previously marketed its products to commercial and industrial customers before agreeing to sell that business line to TotalEnergies in February 2022.

SunPower filed for chapter 11 bankruptcy protection in August 2024. Nasdaq trading was suspended on 16 Aug 2024. Sunpower sold several of its assets to Complete Solaria.

In April 2025, Complete Solaria, Inc. announced it was rebranding as SunPower. Following the announcement, the company held its first earnings call under the rebrand, announcing its first profitable quarter in three years.

== History ==
=== Early history ===
SunPower was founded on April 24, 1985, by Richard Swanson, who was a Stanford University professor focused on electrical engineering. Swanson studied solar power efficiency in the Stanford Electronics Laboratory with funding from research grants. After breaking a record for solar power efficiency in lab conditions, he took a sabbatical to start SunPower and commercialize the technology. Initially, the company was called Eos and was funded with $2,000 in savings between Swanson and his friend Richard Crane. In 1989, Robert Lorenzini invested in the company, became its chairman, and changed the name to SunPower.

Some of SunPower's early revenues were from research grants and using its manufacturing facilities to create silicon wafers for semiconductor companies. Interest grew as SunPower completed prototype installations and portable electronics that use solar power became more popular. Swanson resigned from his academic position at Stanford in 1991, in order to focus on SunPower full-time. The company's revenues grew from $600,000 in 1989 to $1.4 million in 1995, and $6 million in 1996. However, by 2001 the company was anticipating having to lay off half of its employees.

=== Growth ===
SunPower founder Richard Swanson's former classmate, T.J. Rodgers, was the CEO of Cypress Semiconductor and took an interest in investing in the company. At first, the Cypress board wasn't willing to invest, so Rodgers invested $750,000 of his own money. Starting with an investment of $8 million, Cypress eventually invested about $150 million, acquiring a controlling interest in SunPower in 2002. Cypress appointed Tom Werner as the new CEO the following year.

Demand for SunPower's products increased in the early 2000s, due to rising utility costs, government subsidies, and its new A-300 solar cell. In particular, SunPower grew in Germany and California, where new government subsidies were being introduced. By 2005, SunPower was not yet profitable, but had $200 million in backlogged orders. Revenues increased from $5 million in 2003 to $78.7 million in 2005.

As the company was getting closer to profitability, it filed an initial public offering. The 2005 offering raised $138.6 million in funding. The following year, SunPower was profitable for the first time with $236.5 million in revenues. SunPower moved into a larger corporate headquarters location in San Jose, California and secured several contracts with major retailers for solar panel installations. In 2007, SunPower announced plans to expand its manufacturing facility five-fold and build a second factory.

SunPower collaborated with PowerLight to develop its roofing-tile solar product called SunTile. In order to combine their R&D efforts, SunPower acquired PowerLight for $265 million, in January 2007. Analysts estimated the acquisition doubled SunPower's size. Shortly afterwards, PowerLight secured a $330 million contract, the largest SunPower had ever done. By 2007, half of Cypress' revenues, or $775 million, was coming from its investment in SunPower. SunPower was spun off as a separate business from Cypress in 2008.

SunPower acquired Sunray Renewable Energy, a solar panel company based in Italy, for $277 million in 2010, in order to expand in Europe. The following year, SunPower cut back production due to an overall market decline in solar power purchases. SunPower also announced the French oil and gas company Total was acquiring a majority interest in SunPower for $1.37 billion. In 2012, SunPower founder Richard Swanson retired, though he continued to serve on the SunPower advisory board.

By 2013, SunPower's revenues rebounded and it started expanding its manufacturing facilities again. That same year, it acquired Greenbotics, which developed automated cleaning systems for solar panels, and Dragonfly, which developed solar micro-inverters. This was followed by SunPower's 2014 acquisition of SolarBridge, which developed microinverters used to improve the efficiency of solar panels. In 2018, SunPower sold its microinverter business to Enphase Energy and since that time Sunpower has used Enphase microinverters in all AC module products.

In 2014, SunPower raised $220 million from Bank of America and Merrill Lynch, in order to fund customer financing options. That same year, SunPower invested $20 million in a home energy app company called Tendril. As part of the deal, the two companies began integrating their products, so the home automation software from Tendril could time heavy energy use for when the solar panels are generating the most power.

=== Spin-offs ===
In 2019, SunPower announced it was going to spin off its manufacturing division into a separate business in Singapore named Maxeon Solar Technologies. As part of the deal, Tianjin Zhonghuan Semiconductor Co invested $298 million for a 29% interest in Maxeon. The remaining SunPower business became focused on services, installation, batteries, and other products. In 2021, Tom Werner retired as CEO and Peter Faricy took his place as CEO.

In February 2022, SunPower spun off its commercial and industrial installation divisions, which were purchased by SunPower investor TotalEnergies for $250 million. SunPower said the transaction would allow it to focus on residential installations.

=== Technical default and bankruptcy ===
The company announced on December 18, 2023, that there was a question it would be a "going concern," indicating that leadership was uncertain if the company could continue operations given its current financial position. The company also announced that it had previously incorrectly accounted for inventory, causing a technical default; however, creditors gave the company time to shore up its finances before calling those debts.

On August 5, 2024, SunPower filed for Chapter 11 bankruptcy protection. The company entered a stalking horse bid to sell off its assets to Complete Solaria, Inc. for $50 million, and in April 2025, Complete Solaria, Inc. announced it was rebranding as SunPower. Following the announcement, the company held its first earnings call under the rebrand, announcing its first profitable quarter in three years.
