= APsystems =

Technology company

- Type: Public
- Industry: Renewable energy
- Founded: 2010; 16 years ago
- Founders: Zhi-min Ling; Yuhao Luo
- Headquarters: Jiaxing, China
- Key people: Zhi-min Ling (co-founder and CEO); Yuhao Luo (co-founder and CTO); Olivier Jacques (President, Global Business Units)
- Website: apsystems.com

Altenergy Power System better known as APsystems (formerly APS) is a global technology company that operates in the renewable energy space.

APsystems is a provider of multi-platform module-level power electronics (MLPE) solutions for the solar photovoltaic (PV) industry. Their product offerings include microinverters, energy storage systems, and rapid shutdown devices.

It was founded in Silicon Valley in 2010 and operates across four global business units, serving customers in over 150 countries. The company reports millions of units sold, contributing to over 7 TWh of clean energy production.

It is a publicly traded company listed as Yuneng Technology Co. Ltd. with the stock symbol 688348.SS.

== History ==
APsystems was founded as APS in 2010 in Silicon Valley, the company established a joint venture in Jiaxing, Zhejiang, China operating a manufacturing facility there.

In 2011, the company opened up an office in Sydney, Australia. The same year, they launched their first single-module microinverter, the YC200.

In 2012, APS launched its flagship YC500 dual-module microinverter and planned the YC1000-3, considered the world's first true 3-phase microinverter.

As of 2013, APS had global subsidiaries in the United States, China and Australia. The company reported cumulative worldwide shipments of 80,000 microinverters as of March 2013. Greentech Media Research ranked APS number two in global microinverter suppliers by shipments in 2013. During that year, APS America announced new distribution channels in the United States, including Fortune Energy and Blue Frog Solar. Blue Frog was distributing APS microinverters certified as made in Washington for the state incentive program, which offers increased payments for systems that use components manufactured in the state. At the time, APS America was offering two microinverter products, the YC500A and the YC250A. APS had announced the development of the YC1000-3, a 900 Wac 3-phase microinverter that will enable up to 13 units (52 PV modules) per AC circuit. The same year, the company opened up a warehouse in the Netherlands and expanded to Benelux namely Netherlands, Belgium and Luxembourg.

In March 2014, APS America microinverters were available broadly across the Pacific Northwest United States, including residential development projects such as Grow Community, a net-zero and townhome community on Bainbridge Island, Washington.

In May 2014, Itek Energy in Bellingham, Washington partnered with Blue Frog Solar, one of the American distributors of APS microinverters, on a Habitat for Humanity project in Port Orchard, Washington.

In August 2014, APS America signed up with distributor Clean Energy Supply to distribute their products in the New York metropolitan area.

In October 2014, APS began shipping its new YC1000 Microinverter, the first 3-phase solar microinverter, handling 277/480 grid voltages with 900 watts maximum output, ZigBee communication and an integrated ground. The same month and year, APS announced its project of the year awards program.

In 2015, the company surpassed 250MWp installed worldwide.

In March 2015, APS and its Washington state distributor, Blue Frog Solar donated YC1000 microinverters to North Seattle College. Artisan Electric was the local installer that submitted the proposal that selected the APS YC1000 microinverters for their true 3-phase output. The APS units tied into the building's 480-V circuit without the need for step-up transformers, in an electrical room that would have been too small to accommodate a central string inverter.

In September 2015, APS changed its name to APsystems.

In October 2015, APsystems assisted architecture students at the University of Kansas through the Studio 804 project regarding a solar construction project for designing and building new homes that take advantage of renewable power. APSystems offered microinverter units as a donation.

In 2016 APsystems surpassed 300 MWp installed worldwide, planned investment in Europe, the Middle East and Africa and opened an office in Lyon, France for its Western and South Europe operations.

In March 2016, APsystems microinverters were certified to meet the National Electrical Code (NEC) 2014 rapid shutdown requirements. The system design ensures that DC conductors energized within a building are no more than 5 feet in length, and no more than 10 feet from the array, a feature that also aligned with the upcoming NEC 2017 standards at the time.

In September 2016, APsystems introduced a new microinverter and a mobile installer tool that assists job contractors on the worksite. The microinverter was the YC500i offering 548-W peak output on an advanced, proven dual-module platform, offering trunk cable connectivity with internal ground for installers and jurisdictions that prefer trunk-based system designs complementing the company's flagship YC500 with daisy-chain connectivity.

In November 2016, the YC500i was certified for use in the Greater Los Angeles area.

In 2017, the company opened an office in Mexico and surpassed 400 MWp installed Worldwide.

In January 2017, APsystems joined the Sungage Financial approved vendor list, bringing APsystems microinverter line to a residential solar lending platform, in response to requests from national solar installers.

In February 2017, the company partnered up with Extend the Day, a charity organization that gives solar reading lights to school children in disadvantaged countries with no access to electricity.

In September 2017, APsystems introduced the YC600, a dual-module, smart grid and Rule 21-compliant microinverter at the Solar Power International in Las Vegas. According to Solar Builder Magazine, the YC600 provides the highest peak output power, faster transmission speed, and more modules allowed per string than comparable microinverters.

In January 2018, the company joined the approved vendor list for Sunnova, a United States residential solar and energy provider.

As of January 2018, APsystems microinverters had produced more than 130 GWh of energy with a carbon offset of over 95,000 tons.

In August 2018, APsystems launched the QS1, a four-module 1200-W microinverter for residential applications at the Solar Power International trade show in Anaheim, California. Solar Power World Magazine picked it as one of the Top Solar Products of 2018.

At the end of 2018, the company surpassed 550 MW globally.

In 2019, it surpassed 750 MW globally and launched the APsmart brand, a brand of DC module-level power electronics (MLPE) focused on providing rapid shutdown solutions for solar photovoltaic (PV) systems, specifically designed to enhance safety and compliance with National Electrical Code (NEC) and SunSpec standards.

In January 2019, the APsystems QS1 microinverter started shipping to the United States.

In 2020, APsmart RSD device shipments surpassed 100MV and APsystems Microinverter cumulative shipments exceeded 1GW globally.

In June 2021, Yotta Energy, an energy technology company based in Austin, Texas partnered with the company and introduced the DualPower Inverter operating at a low voltage and working with single-phase and three-phase applications.

In September 2021, the company introduced the DS3 series, a dual-module, single-phase microinverter product line for residential and commercial solar applications at the Solar Solutions International trade show in the Netherlands. The DS3 series started being shipped to the United States in February 2022.

At the end of 2021, APsystems reached more than 2 GW+ of shipments worldwide.

In March 2022, APsystems had more than 146,000 solar installation sites in over 100 countries 2 gigawatts (GW) of installed capacity at the time.

In June 2022, APsystems went public and was listed on the Shanghai Stock Exchange.

In November 2022, the company introduced the QT2, a microinverter aimed at three-phase commercial and industrial solar projects. The same month, it was added to Sunstone Credit's approved vendor list.

At the end of 2022, the company's MLPE product shipments exceeded 3 GW globally.

In May 2023, APsystems introduced the EZ1 microinverters for balcony photovoltaic (PV) systems and do-it-yourself (DIY) solar installations. The same month, Solarbe Global considered APSystems' fourth-generation microinverters as one of the top microinverters of 2023 in terms of efficiency reaching 97% peak efficiency.

As of October 2023, the company had surpassed 10 million interconnected units.

In June 2024, APsystems and its microinverters were added to the CertainTeed Solstice Panel warranty approved vendor list. The same month, the company introduced the EZHI, a single-phase hybrid inverter for balcony photovoltaics.

In September 2024, APsystems unveiled the ELS 11.4k PCS, offering a nominal power rating of up to 11,400 VA and peak backup power of up to 17,100 VA for 10 seconds, allowing the device to support more loads, ensuring greater energy security in both everyday use and critical backup situations.

In February 2025, the company was ranked as one of the most bankable inverter companies by Sinovoltaics.

In March 2025, APsystems announced that its DS3 and QT2 series microinverters come with a 25-year standard warranty in the United States.

In May 2025, APsystems also changed its standard warranty term for DS3 and QT2 microinverters in Canada to 25 years.

In June 2025, the company introduced the QS2, a single-phase quad microinverter with a 2200W output and support for four high-power PV modules via independent MPPT channels. It also introduced the AHS series Solar Battery Hybrid Controller, AHS-6.3.

In September 2025, APsystems was named the most bankable solar inverter company worldwide by Sinovoltaics.

== Global operations ==
APsystems operates in China, the United States, Canada, Mexico, Europe, Middle East, Africa, Asia Pacific, Australia and New Zealand.

The company is headquartered in Jiaxing, China and has regional offices in the United States (Austin, Texas), China (Shanghai), Australia (Sydney), Netherlands (Amsterdam), France (Lyon) and Mexico (Zapopan).

== See also ==
- Solar inverter
- Photovoltaic system
- Photovoltaics
- Solar energy
