= Maxeon Solar Technologies =

Singaporean solar energy company

Maxeon Solar Technologies, Ltd.
- Company type: Public
- Traded as: Nasdaq: MAXN; Russell 2000 component
- Industry: Renewable energy
- Predecessor: SunPower
- Founded: August 2020; 5 years ago
- Headquarters: Marina Bay Financial Centre, Singapore (registered headquarters); San Jose, California, U.S. (executive offices)
- Area served: Worldwide
- Key people: Bill Mulligan (CEO); Donald Colvin (chair)
- Revenue: ▲US$1.06 billion (2022)
- Operating income: ▲US$−200 million (2022)
- Net income: ▲US$−267 million (2022)
- Total assets: ▲US$1.26 billion (2022)
- Total equity: ▼US$48 million (2022)
- Owner: TCL (36.5%); TotalEnergies (24.4%)
- Number of employees: 5,344 (2022)
- Website: maxeon.com
- Footnotes / references Financials as of 1 January 2023. References

Maxeon Solar Technologies, Ltd. is a Singapore-based company that designs and manufactures photovoltaic panels. The company was previously a division of the American company SunPower. Maxeon was spun off from SunPower in August 2020. Maxeon was the primary provider of solar panels for SunPower through March 2024. Beyond the United States, Maxeon has sales operations in more than 100 countries and has the rights to use the SunPower brand in countries outside the United States.

== History ==
When SunPower spun-off Maxeon in August 2020, the Tianjin Zhonghuan Semiconductor Company invested US$298 million for a 24% interest in Maxeon. Chinese technology company TCL later purchased Tianjin Zhonghuan Semiconductor, becoming a major investor in Maxeon. SunPower investor TotalEnergies also kept a significant ownership stake in Maxeon.

In March 2024, Maxeon Solar filed a patent infringement lawsuit against Canadian Solar. The alleged infringement was linked to Maxeon's TOPCon solar cell technology.

TCL, a Chinese company, has the majority stake in Maxeon. The company's panels face detention from U.S. Customs & Border Protection citing the Uyghur Forced Labor Prevention Act (UFLPA).

== Products ==
Its products are known for being more expensive, but producing energy more efficiently than competing products. (Note: "SunPower panels are known for being the most efficient in the industry, able to convert more of the energy in sunlight into electricity. That can give its panels an advantage for space-constrained installations like rooftops, though they can also be more expensive than rivals’ products." (source: Los Angeles Times) "SunPower has built a reputation as a maker of highly efficient solar panels and charges a premium price for them." (source: GreenTechMedia) "SunPower’s panels, though not the cheapest, are much in demand because they are most efficient at transforming sunlight into energy." (source: Reuters)) Maxeon panels are often used when there is a limited amount of space for the panels, such as on rooftops. (Note: "That can give its panels an advantage for space-constrained installations like rooftops, though they can also be more expensive than rivals’ products.")

Ordinarily, the electrical contacts are on the front of a solar panel, facing the sun. Light hitting Maxeon's panels channel the generated electricity to contacts on the back of the panel rather than the front, reducing the amount of sunlight that is reflected rather than turned into energy. Hence, Maxeon panels are sought for efficiency and aesthetic reasons.
