= Enphase Energy =

American technology company

Enphase Energy, Inc.
- Type: Public
- Traded as: Nasdaq: ENPH; S&P 600 component
- ISIN: US29355A1079
- Industry: Renewable energy
- Founded: 2006; 20 years ago
- Founders: Raghu Belur; Martin Fornage
- Headquarters: Fremont, California, U.S.
- Key people: Badri Kothandaraman (CEO)
- Products: Solar micro-inverters; Energy storage batteries; Monitoring systems
- Revenue: ▲US$1.47 billion (2025)
- Net income: ▲US$172 million (2025)
- Number of employees: 2,781 (2024)
- Website: enphase.com

Enphase Energy, Inc. is an American energy technology company headquartered in Fremont, California, that develops and manufactures solar micro-inverters, battery energy storage, and EV charging stations primarily for residential customers. Enphase was established in 2006 and is the first company to successfully commercialize solar micro-inverters, which convert the direct current (DC) power generated by solar panels into grid-compatible alternating current (AC) for use or export. The company has shipped more than 48 million microinverters to 2.5 million solar systems in more than 140 countries.

== History ==
Most solar photovoltaic systems use a central inverter, where the panels are connected together in a series creating a string, which delivers all the direct current (DC) power produced into the inverter for conversion into grid-compatible alternating current (AC). The major drawback to this approach is that, unless DC power optimizers are used, the entire string's output is limited by the output of the lowest-performing panel. Solar micro-inverters address this problem by converting the DC into AC in a small inverter placed behind each individual solar panel.

Enphase founder Martin Fornage discovered this issue when he saw the low performance of the central inverter for the solar array on his ranch. Fornage was looking for a new opportunity after the 2001 Telecoms crash and brought an idea to build micro-inverters to his former Cerent Corporation colleague, Raghu Belur, and they formed PVI Solutions. The two hired Paul Nahi to be CEO at the end of 2006 and the trio formed Enphase Energy, Inc. in early 2007. Enphase raised $6 million in private equity, and in 2008, released its first microinverter, the M175. Their second generation product, 2009's M190, had sales of about 400,000 units in 2009 and early 2010. Enphase grew to 13% marketshare for residential systems by mid-2010.

Enphase went public in March 2012 and began trading on the Nasdaq with the stock symbol ENPH.

In October 2014, Enphase announced it would enter the battery home energy storage market. The first batteries were installed in Australia and New Zealand in mid-2016, but the launch of any Enphase battery system in the North American market was delayed until July 2020. When released in the North American market, the battery system was part of the Ensemble energy management system, and substantially different to the first generation on-grid only battery previously released.

Enphase experienced leadership changes in September 2017 when the president and CEO, Paul Nahi, announced his resignation from the company. Badri Kothandaraman was appointed the company's new president and CEO. Kothandaraman was previously the company's chief operating officer.

As of 2020, Enphase had about a 48% market share for residential installations in the US, which represents 72% of the entire world micro-inverter market. In the global market for inverters for all customers (residential, commercial and industrial), microinverters have a 1.7% share of the inverter market.

In 2021, Enphase completed a series of acquisitions that focused on software-as-a-service and home electrification: Sofdesk's Solargraf, a software platform offering digital tools and services to support the sales process for solar installers; the Solar Design Services business of DIN Engineering Services, a software service provider for solar proposal drawings and permit plan sets; 365 Pronto, a software platform that connects solar installers with operations and maintenance providers; and ClipperCreek, a company that offers electric vehicle (EV) charging solutions for residential and commercial customers in the U.S.

Also in 2021, the company launched its eighth-generation microinverter technology, the IQ8 series, to customers in North America. As of 2022, Enphase has shipped more than 48 million microinverters and deployed more than two million Enphase-based systems in more than 140 countries.

In 2022, Enphase completed the acquisition of SolarLeadFactory LLC, a company that provides leads to solar installers.

== See also ==
- List of renewable energy companies by country
