= Richard Swanson =

American electrical engineer (born 1945)

Richard Swanson (born 1945) is an American electrical engineer and businessman, retired founder of SunPower, a solar photovoltaic cell manufacturer.

== Biography ==
Swanson was born in Davenport, Iowa in 1945.

He graduated in 1969 with Bachelor of Engineering and Master of Engineering degrees from Ohio State University and, in 1975, received a Doctor of Philosophy in electrical engineering from Stanford University. He then joined the university faculty at Stanford and began research in solar cell technology. In 1985 Swanson received grants for his solar energy research from the Electric Power Research Institute and the U.S. Department of Energy. That same year he founded SunPower Corporation. Swanson is credited for creating Swanson's law, an observation that solar cell prices decline by 20% for every doubling of solar panel industry capacity. The law is often compared to the better known Moore's Law.

=== Honors ===
In 2002, Richard was awarded the William R. Cherry Award by the Institute of Electrical and Electronics Engineers (IEEE). Additionally, Swanson received the Becquerel Prize in Photovoltaics from the European Communities in 2006. He was elected a Fellow of the IEEE in 2008 and has been a member of the National Academy of Engineering since 2009.
