= Power optimizer =

Electrical conversion technology

A power optimizer is a DC to DC converter technology developed to maximize the energy harvest from solar photovoltaic or wind turbine systems. They do this by individually tuning the performance of the panel or wind turbine through maximum power point tracking, and optionally tuning the output to match the performance of the string inverter (DC to AC inverter). Power optimizers are especially useful when the performance of the power generating components in a distributed system will vary widely, such as due to differences in equipment, shading of light or wind, or being installed facing different directions or widely separated locations.

Power optimizers for solar applications can be similar to microinverters in that both systems attempt to isolate individual panels in order to improve overall system performance. A smart module is a power optimizer integrated into a solar module. A microinverter essentially combines a power optimizer with a small inverter in a single enclosure that is used on every panel, while the power optimizer leaves the inverter in a separate box and uses only one inverter for the entire array. The claimed advantage to this "hybrid" approach is lower overall system costs, avoiding the distribution of electronics.

== Description ==
=== Maximum power point tracking (MPPT) ===
Most energy production or storage devices have a complex relationship between the power they produce, the load placed on them, and the efficiency of the delivery. A conventional battery, for instance, stores energy in chemical reactions in its electrolytes and plates. These reactions take time to occur, which limits the rate at which the power can be efficiently drawn from the cell. For this reason, large batteries used for power storage generally list two or more capacities, normally the "2 hour" and "20 hour" rates, with the 2 hour rate often being around 50% of the 20 hour rate.

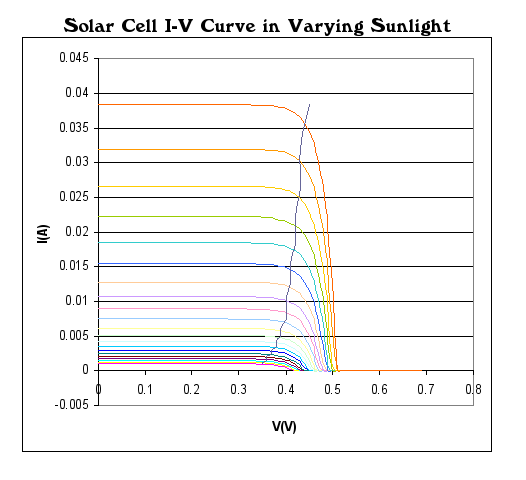
Typical cell I-V curves showing the relationship between current, voltage and total output for differing amounts of incoming light.

Solar panels have similar issues due to the speed at which the cell can convert solar photons into electrons, ambient temperature, and a host of other issues. In this case there is a complex non-linear relationship between voltage, current and the total amount of power being produced, the "I-V curve". In order to optimize collection, modern solar arrays use a technique known as "maximum power point tracking" (MPPT) to monitor the total output of the array and continually adjust the presented load to keep the system operation at its peak efficiency point.

Traditionally, solar panels produce voltages around 30 V. This is too low to be effectively converted into AC to feed to the power grid. To address this, panels are strung together in series to increase the voltage to something more appropriate for the inverter being used, typically about 600 V.

The drawback to this approach is that MPPT system can only be applied to the array as a whole. Because the I-V curve is non-linear, a panel that is even slightly shadowed can have dramatically lower output, and greatly increase its internal resistance. As the panels are wired in series, this would cause the output of the entire string to be reduced due to the increased total resistance. This change in performance causes the MPPT system to change the operation point, moving the rest of the panels away from their best performance.

Because of their sequential wiring, power mismatch between PV modules within a string can lead to a drastic and disproportionate loss of power from the entire solar array, in some cases leading to complete system failure. Shading of as little as 9% of the entire surface array of a PV system can, in some circumstances, lead to a system-wide power loss of as much as 54%. Although this problem is most notable with "large" events like a passing shadow, even the tiniest differences in panel performance, due to dirt, differential aging or tiny differences during manufacturing, can result in the array as a whole operating away from its best MPPT point. "Panel matching" is an important part of solar array design.

=== Isolating panels ===
These problems have led to a number of different potential solutions that isolate panels individually or into much smaller groups (2 to 3 panels) in an effort to provide MPPT that avoids the problems of large strings.

One solution, the microinverter, places the entire power conversion system directly on the back of each panel. This allows the system to track the MPPT for each panel, and directly output AC power that matches the grid. The panels are then wired together in parallel, so even the failure of one of the panels or microinverters will not lead to a loss of power from the string. However, this approach has the disadvantage of distributing the power conversion circuitry, which, in theory, is the expensive part of the system. Microinverters, at least as late as early 2011, had significantly higher price per watt.

This leads, naturally, to the power optimizer concept, where only the MPPT system is distributed to the panels. In this case the conversion from DC to AC takes place in a single inverter, one that lacks the MPPT hardware or has it disabled. Advanced solutions are able to work correctly with all solar inverters, to make possible optimisation of already installed plants. According to its supporters, this "hybrid" approach produces the lowest-cost solution overall, while still maintaining the advantages of the microinverter approach.

Recent architectures such as series–parallel differential power processing combine module-integrated and string-level converters via virtual buses to mitigate both series current mismatches and parallel voltage mismatches while processing only a fraction of total system power.

=== Implementation ===
Power optimizers are essentially DC-DC converters, taking the DC power from a solar panel at whatever voltage and current is optimal (via MPPT), then converting that to a different voltage and current that best suits the central / string inverter.

Some power optimizers are designed to work in conjunction with a central inverter from the same manufacturer, which allows the inverter to communicate with the optimizers to ensure that the inverter always receives the same total voltage from the panel string. In this situation, if there is a string of panels in series and a single panel's output drops due to shade, its voltage will drop so that it can deliver the same amount of current (amps). This would cause the string voltage to drop as well, except that the central inverter adjusts all the other optimizers so that their output voltage increases slightly, maintaining the fixed string voltage required at the inverter (just at reduced available amperage while the single panel is shaded). The down side of this type of optimizer is that it requires a central inverter from the same manufacturer as the optimizers, so it is not possible to gradually retrofit these in an existing installation unless the inverter is also replaced, as well as optimizers installed on all panels at the same time.
