= Telecoms crash =

Stock market crash in 2001

The Telecoms crash, also known as the Telecommunications Bubble, was a stock market crash that occurred in 2001, after the bursting of the dot-com bubble.

The telecommunications industry had experienced significant growth and investment during the 1990s, fueled by the expansion of the internet and the introduction of wireless technology. Companies such as WorldCom, Global Crossing, and Lucent Technologies had achieved enormous market valuations based on expectations of continued growth and profitability. By the late 1990s, the industry had become overvalued and highly leveraged. Many companies had taken on substantial debt to finance their expansion, and investors had poured billions of dollars into the sector based on unrealistic expectations of growth and profitability.

The crash had an impact on the global economy, and resulted in a sharp decline in the value of telecommunications related stocks and bonds, leading to significant financial losses for investors, widespread job losses and decline in consumer spending, and eventually leading to the collapse of many companies.

It was called "the biggest and fastest rise and fall in business history".

== Causes ==
Partially a result of greed and excessive optimism, especially about the growth of data traffic fueled by the rise of the Internet, in the five years after the Telecommunications Act of 1996 went into effect, telecommunications companies invested more than $500 billion, mostly financed with debt, into laying fiber optic cable, adding new switches, and building wireless networks. In many areas, such as the Dulles Technology Corridor in Virginia, governments funded technology infrastructure and created favorable business and tax law to encourage companies to expand. The growth in capacity vastly outstripped the growth in demand. Spectrum auctions for 3G in the United Kingdom in April 2000, led by Chancellor of the Exchequer Gordon Brown, raised £22.5 billion. In Germany, in August 2000, the auctions raised £30 billion. A 3G spectrum auction in the United States in 1999 had to be re-run when the winners defaulted on their bids of $4 billion. The re-auction netted 10% of the original sales prices. When financing became hard to find as the dot-com bubble burst, the high debt ratios of these companies led to bankruptcy. The industry owed a trillion dollars "much of which will never be repaid and will have to be written off by investors" according to a testimony by Federal Communications Commission Chairman Michael Powell to the Senate Commerce Committee on July 30, 2002. Bond investors recovered just over 20% of their investments.

However, several telecom executives sold stock before the crash including Philip Anschutz, who reaped $1.9 billion, Joseph Nacchio, who reaped $248 million, and Gary Winnick, who sold $748 million worth of shares.

=== Contrary view ===
Paul Klemperer, Oxford University economics professor and adviser to the UK government in its 3G auction, has disputed whether the crash should be blamed on the auction rather than broader economic problems. While agreeing that the licence bidders may have been mistaken in bidding as high as they did, and that the money was a transfer from shareholders to the governments, he argued that the one off and up front sunk costs of the auction should have had no effect when considering the profitability of future investment and should not have significantly affected the future behaviour of the telecoms companies. He also notes that in the United Kingdom it was NTL Incorporated (which failed in its bid) which ended up in the most trouble financially, and questions whether the $100 billion cost of the auctions could explain the $700 billion drop in two years which was seen in the market capitalisation of the telecoms companies. The spectrum auctions were designed to extract the maximum for the government offering a lower number of licenses than potential bidders (just as the re-run auctions in the USA had). This had the effect of halting the money supply from the telco vendors, which in turn destroyed not only the R&D efforts, but ultimately damaged the telcom development companies as well. 20,000 workers in the UK lost jobs as a result of a government cash injection.

== Subsequent spectrum auctions ==
Subsequent government auctions of the 3G radio spectrum, in Australia and New Zealand were met with low bids, and strong suspicion of collusion between operators of bidding low and secretly defining network sharing agreements.

Hong Kong's 2013 approach was to share in the profit from a spectrum allocation rather than issue a potentially damaging upfront payment for licences. Britain's 2013 UK spectrum auction for 4G fell £1 billion short of the stated target of £3.5 billion. The pension liabilities also added to the financial troubles of telecom companies and the 2013 auctions in the United Kingdom produced disappointing results.
