= Maximum power point tracking =

Solar cell power extraction method

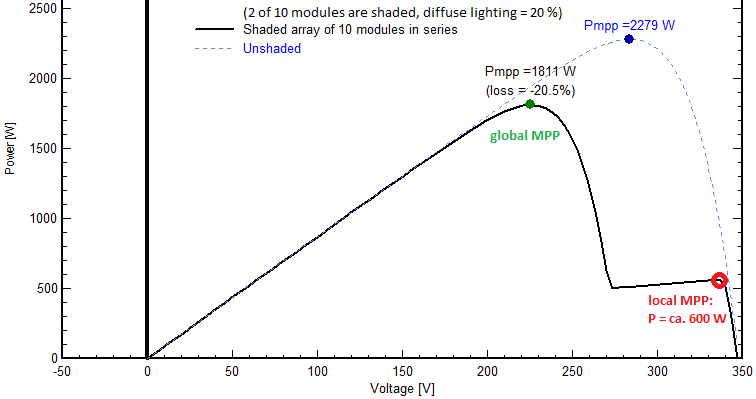
Power/voltage-curve of a partially shaded PV system, with marked local and global MPP

Maximum power point tracking (MPPT), or sometimes just power point tracking (PPT), is a technique used with variable power sources to maximize energy extraction as conditions vary. The technique is most commonly used with photovoltaic (PV) solar systems but can also be used with wind turbines, optical power transmission and thermophotovoltaics.

PV solar systems have varying relationships to inverter systems, external grids, battery banks, and other electrical loads. The central problem addressed by MPPT is that the efficiency of power transfer from the solar cell depends on the amount of available sunlight, shading, solar panel temperature and the load's electrical characteristics. As these conditions vary, the load characteristic (impedance) that gives the highest power transfer changes. The system is optimized when the load characteristic changes to keep power transfer at highest efficiency. This optimal load characteristic is called the maximum power point (MPP). MPPT is the process of adjusting the load characteristic as the conditions change. Circuits can be designed to present optimal loads to the photovoltaic cells and then convert the voltage, current, or frequency to suit other devices or systems.

Solar cells' non-linear relationship between temperature and total resistance can be analyzed based on the current-voltage (I-V) curve and the power-voltage (P-V) curves. MPPT samples cell output and applies the proper resistance (load) to obtain maximum power. MPPT devices are typically integrated into an electric power converter system that provides voltage or current conversion, filtering, and regulation for driving various loads, including power grids, batteries, or motors. Solar inverters convert DC power to AC power and may incorporate MPPT.

The power at the MPP (P_{mpp}) is the product of the MPP voltage (V_{mpp}) and MPP current (I_{mpp}).

In general, the P-V curve of a partially shaded solar array can have multiple peaks, and some algorithms can get stuck in a local maximum rather than the global maximum of the curve.

== Background ==
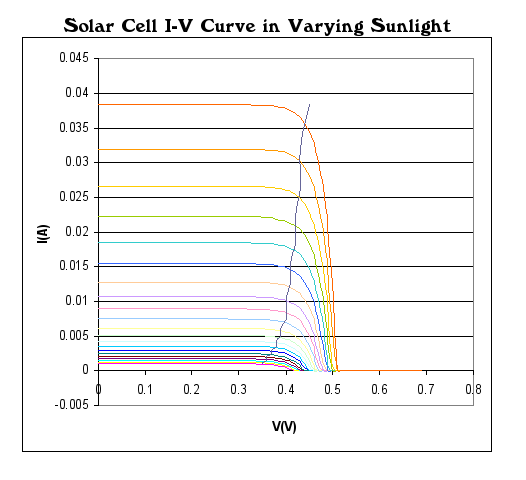
Photovoltaic solar cell I-V curves where a line intersects the knee of the curves where the maximum power transfer point is located.

Photovoltaic cells have a complex relationship between their operating environment and the power they produce. The nonlinear I-V curve characteristic of a given cell in specific temperature and insolation conditions can be functionally characterized by a fill factor (FF). Fill factor is defined as the ratio of the maximum power from the cell to the product of open circuit voltage V_{oc} and short-circuit current I_{sc}. Tabulated data is often used to estimate the maximum power that a cell can provide with an optimal load under given conditions:

$$P=FF \, V_\text{oc} I_\text{sc}.$$

For most purposes, FF, V_{oc}, and I_{sc} are enough information to give a useful approximate view of the cell's electrical behavior under typical conditions.

For any given set of conditions, cells have a single operating point where the values of the current (I) and voltage (V) of the cell allow maximum power output. These values correspond to a particular load resistance, which is equal to V / I as specified by Ohm's law. The power P is given by P = VI.

A photovoltaic cell, for the majority of its useful curve, acts as a constant current source. However, at a photovoltaic cell's MPP region, its curve has an approximately inverse exponential relationship between current and voltage. From basic circuit theory, the power delivered to a device is optimized (MPP) where the derivative (graphically, the slope) dI/dV of the I-V curve is equal and opposite the I/V ratio (where dP/dV = 0) and corresponds to the "knee" of the curve.

A load with resistance R = V/I equal to the reciprocal of this value draws the maximum power from the device. This is sometimes called the 'characteristic resistance' of the cell. This is a dynamic quantity that changes depending on the level of illumination, as well as other factors such as temperature and cell condition. Lower or higher resistance reduces power output. Maximum power point trackers utilize control circuits or logic to identify this point.

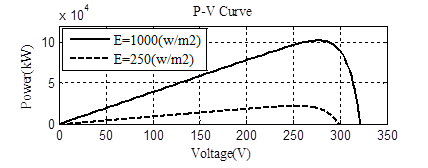
Power-voltage (P-V) curve

If a full power-voltage (P-V) curve is available, then the maximum power point can be obtained using a bisection method.

== Implementation ==
When directly connecting a load to cell, the operating point of the panel is rarely at peak power. The impedance seen by the panel determines its operating point. Setting the impedance correctly achieves peak power. Since panels are DC devices, DC-DC converters transform the impedance of one circuit (source) to the other circuit (load). Changing the duty ratio of the DC-DC converter changes the impedance (duty ratio) seen by the cell. The I-V curve of the panel can be considerably affected by atmospheric conditions such as irradiance and temperature.

MPPT algorithms frequently sample panel voltages and currents, then adjust the duty ratio accordingly. Microcontrollers implement the algorithms. Modern implementations often utilize more sophisticated computers for analytics and load forecasting.

== Classification ==
Controllers can follow several strategies to optimize power output. MPPTs may switch among multiple algorithms as conditions dictate.

=== Perturb and observe ===
In this method the controller adjusts the voltage from the array by a small amount and measures power; if the power increases, further adjustments in that direction are tried until power no longer increases. This is called perturb and observe (P&O) and is most common, although this method can cause power output to oscillate. It is also referred to as a hill climbing method, because it depends on the rise of the curve of power against voltage below the maximum power point, and the fall above that point. Perturb and observe is the most commonly used method due to its ease of implementation. The Perturb and Observe (P&O) algorithm adjusts the operating voltage of a photovoltaic (PV) system to track the maximum power point (MPP). By periodically perturbing the voltage and observing the resulting change in power, the algorithm decides whether to increase or decrease the operating voltage. If the power increases, the perturbation continues in the same direction; otherwise, it reverses direction. The perturb and observe method may result in top-level efficiency, provided that a proper predictive and adaptive hill climbing strategy is adopted.

=== Incremental conductance ===
In this method, the controller measures incremental current and voltage changes to predict the effect of a voltage change. This method requires more computation in the controller, but can track changing conditions more rapidly than P&O. Power output does not oscillate. It utilizes the incremental conductance ($dI/dV$) of the photovoltaic array to compute the sign of the change in power with respect to voltage ($dP/dV$). The incremental conductance method computes MPP by comparison of the incremental conductance ($I_\Delta / V_\Delta$) to the array conductance ($I / V$). When these two are the same ($-I / V = I_\Delta / V_\Delta$), the output voltage is the MPP voltage. The controller maintains this voltage until the irradiation changes and the process is repeated.

The incremental conductance method is based on the observation that at MPP, $dP/dV = 0$, and that $P = IV$. The current from the array can be expressed as a function of the voltage:

$$P = I(V)V.$$

Therefore, $dP/dV = V\,dI/dV + I(V)$. Setting this equal to zero yields: $dI/dV = -I(V)/V$. Therefore, MPP is achieved when the incremental conductance is equal to the negative of the instantaneous conductance. The power-voltage curve characteristic shows that: when the voltage is smaller than MPP, $dP/dV > 0$, so $dI/dV > -I/V$; when the voltage is bigger than MPP, $dP/dV < 0$ or $dI/dV < -I/V$. Thus, a tracker can know where it is on the power-voltage curve by calculating the relation of the change of current/voltage and the current voltage themselves.

=== Current sweep ===
The current sweep method uses a sweep waveform for the array current such that the I-V characteristic of the PV array is obtained and updated at fixed time intervals. MPP voltage can then be computed from the characteristic curve at the same intervals.

=== Constant voltage ===
Constant voltage methods include one in which the output voltage is regulated to a constant value under all conditions and one in which the output voltage is regulated based on a constant ratio to the measured open circuit voltage ($V_\text{oc}$). The latter technique may also be labeled the "open voltage" method. If the output voltage is held constant, there is no attempt to track MPP, so it is not strictly a MPPT technique, though it does function in cases when MPP tracking tends to fail, and thus it is sometimes used supplementally. In the open voltage method, power delivery is momentarily interrupted and the open-circuit voltage with zero current is measured. The controller then resumes operation with the voltage controlled at a fixed ratio, such as 0.76, of the open-circuit voltage $V_\text{oc}$. This is usually a value that has been predetermined to be the MPP, either empirically or based on modelling, for expected operating conditions. The array's operating point is thus kept near MPP by regulating the array voltage and matching it to the fixed reference voltage $V_\text{ref}=kV_\text{oc}$. The value of $V_\text{ref}$ may be chosen to give optimal performance relative to other factors as well as the MPP, but the central idea is that $V_\text{ref}$ is determined as a ratio to $V_\text{oc}$. One of the inherent approximations in the method is that the ratio of MPP voltage to $V_\text{oc}$ is only approximately constant, so it leaves room for further possible optimization.

=== Temperature method ===
This method estimates the MPP voltage ($V_\text{mpp}$) by measuring the temperature of the solar module and comparing it against a reference. Since changes in irradiation levels have a negligible effect on the MPP voltage, its influences may be ignored - the voltage is assumed to vary linearly with temperature.

This algorithm calculates the following equation:

$$V_\text{mpp}(T)=V_\text{mpp}(T_\text{ref})+u_{V_\text{mpp}}(T-T_\text{ref}),$$
where $V_\text{mpp}$ is the voltage at the maximum power point for a given temperature; $T_\text{ref}$ is a reference temperature; $T$ is the measured temperature; $u_{V_\text{mpp}}$ is the temperature coefficient of $V_\text{mpp}$ (available in the datasheet).

==== Advantages ====
- Simplicity: This algorithm solves one linear equation. Therefore, it requires little computation.
- Can be implemented as an analog or digital circuit.
- Since temperature varies slowly with time, oscillation and instability are non-factors.
- Low cost: temperature sensors are usually cheap.
- Robust against noise.

==== Disadvantages ====
- Estimation error might not be negligible for low irradiation levels (e.g. below 200 W/m^{2}).

=== Comparison of methods ===
Both P&O and incremental conductance are examples of "hill climbing" methods that can find the local maximum of the power curve for the array's operating condition, and so provide a true MPP.

P&O produces power output oscillations around the maximum power point even under steady state irradiance.

Incremental conductance can determine the maximum power point without oscillating. It can perform MPPT under rapidly varying irradiation conditions with higher accuracy than P&O. However, this method can produce oscillations and can perform erratically under rapidly changing atmospheric conditions. The sampling frequency is decreased due to the higher complexity of the algorithm compared to P&O.

In the constant voltage ratio (or "open voltage") method, energy may be lost during the time the current is set to zero. The approximation of 76% as the $V_\text{mpp}/V_\text{oc}$ ratio is not necessarily accurate. Although simple and low-cost to implement, the interruptions reduce array efficiency and do not ensure finding the actual MPP. However, efficiencies of some systems may reach above 95%.

== Placement ==
Traditional solar inverters perform MPPT for the entire array. In such systems the same current, dictated by the inverter, flows through all modules in the string (series). Because different modules have different I-V curves and different MPPs (due to manufacturing tolerance, partial shading, etc.) this architecture means some modules will be performing below their MPP, costing efficiency.

Instead, MPPTs can be deployed for individual modules, allowing each to operate at peak efficiency despite uneven shading, soiling or electrical mismatch.

Data suggest having one inverter with one MPPT for a project that has identical number of east and west-facing modules presents no disadvantages when compared to having two inverters or one inverter with more than one MPPT.

== Battery operation ==
At night, an off-grid PV system may use batteries to supply loads. Although the fully charged battery pack voltage may be close to the PV panel's MPP voltage, this is unlikely to be true at sunrise when the battery is partially discharged. Charging may begin at a voltage considerably below the PV panel MPP voltage, and an MPPT can resolve this mismatch.

When the batteries are fully charged and PV production exceeds local loads, an MPPT can no longer operate the panel at its MPP as the excess power has no load to absorb it. The MPPT must then shift the PV panel operating point away from the peak power point until production matches demand. (An alternative approach commonly used in spacecraft is to divert surplus PV power into a resistive load, allowing the panel to operate continuously at its peak power point in order to keep the panel as cool as possible.)

In a grid-connected system, all delivered power from solar modules is sent to the grid. Therefore, the MPPT in a grid connected system always attempts to operate at MPP.
