= Floating solar =

Solar panels mounted on a structure that floats

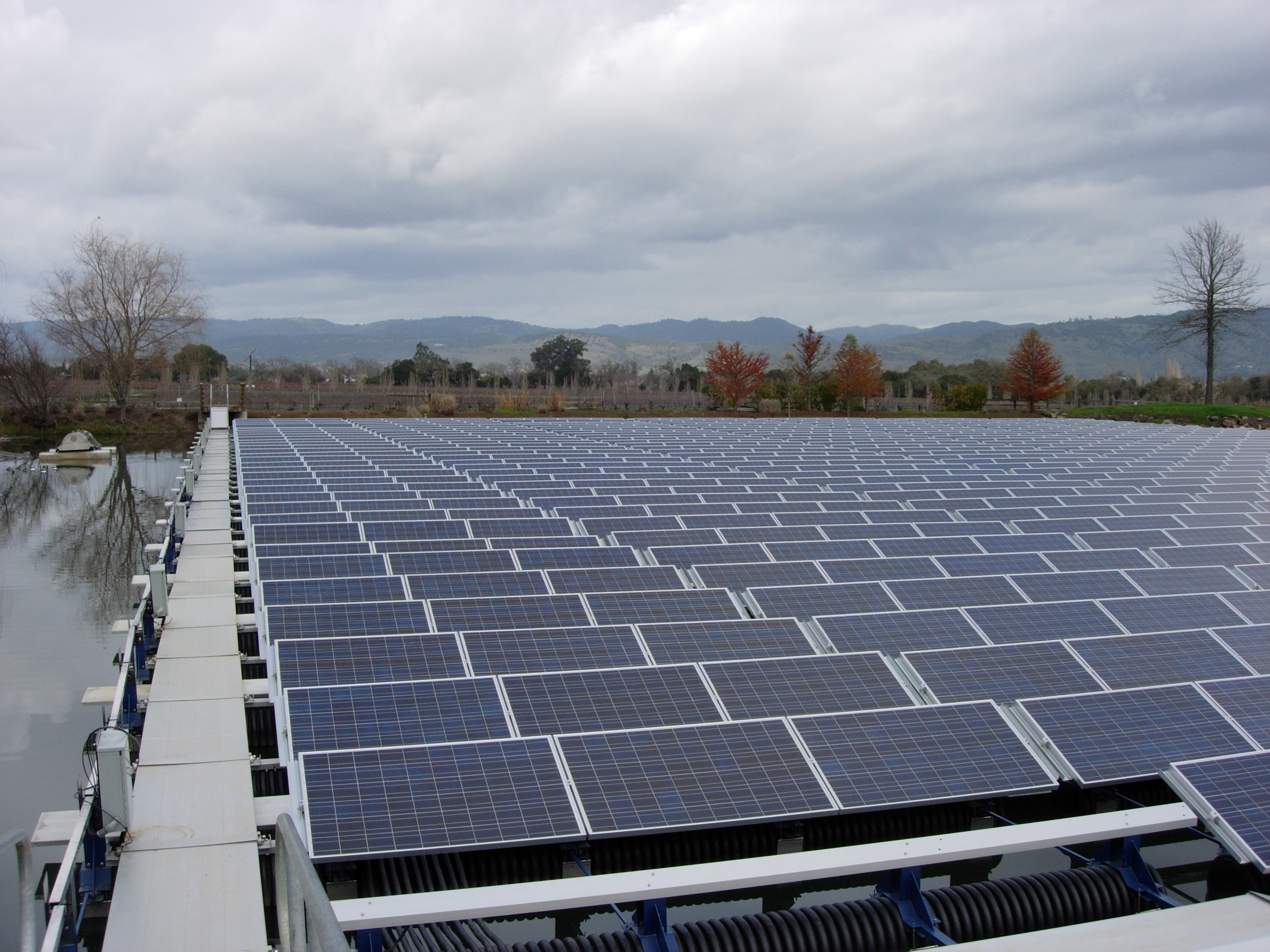
Floating photovoltaic on an irrigation pond

Floating solar or floating photovoltaics (FPV), sometimes called floatovoltaics, are solar panels mounted on a structure that floats. The structures that hold the panels usually consist of plastic buoys and cables. They are then placed on a body of water (e.g., Reservoirs, quarry lakes, irrigation canals or remediation and tailing ponds).

The systems can have advantages over photovoltaics (PV) on land. Water surfaces may be less expensive than the cost of land, and there are fewer rules and regulations for structures built on bodies of water not used for recreation. Life cycle analysis indicates that foam-based FPV have some of the shortest energy payback times (1.3 years) and the lowest greenhouse gas emissions to energy ratio (11 kg CO_{2} eq/MWh) in crystalline silicon solar photovoltaic technologies reported. FPV can be used to generate electricity for any application as well as to make green hydrogen via electrolysis on the same water they are floating on.

Floating arrays can achieve higher efficiencies than PV panels on land because water cools the panels. The panels can have a special coating to prevent rust or corrosion. Floating SPV also provide shade, slow evaporation and inhibit the growth of algae.

The market for this renewable energy technology has grown rapidly since 2016. The first 20 plants with capacities of a few dozen kWp were built between 2007 and 2013. Installed power grew from 3 GW in 2020, to 13 GW in 2022, surpassing a prediction of 10 GW by 2025. The World Bank estimated there are 6,600 large bodies of water suitable for floating solar, with a technical capacity of over 4,000 GW if 10% of their surfaces were covered with panels.

The US has more floating solar potential than any other country in the world. Bodies of water suitable for floating solar are well-distributed throughout the US The southeast and southern US plains states generally have reservoirs with the largest capacities.

== History ==
Energy production from floating solar photovoltaic sources expanded dramatically in the last half of the 2010s, and was forecast to grow exponentially in the early 2020s.

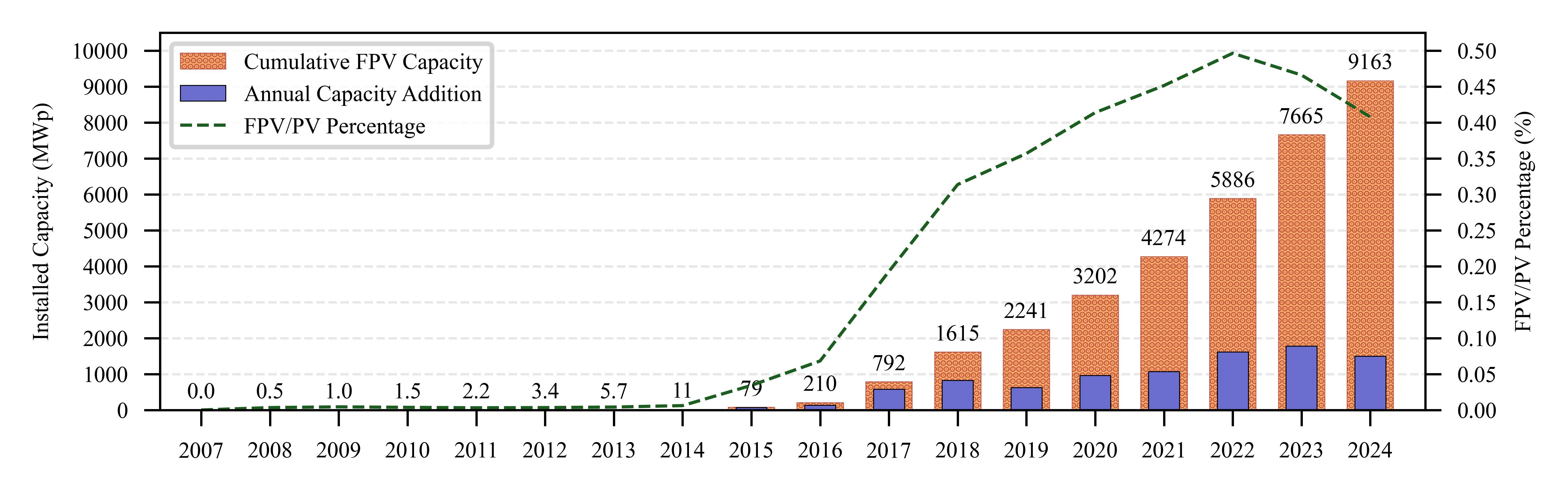
Growth of global installed capacity of floating photovoltaics from 2007 to 2024

American, Danish, French, Italian and Japanese nationals were the first to register patents for floating solar. In Italy the first registered patent regarding PV modules on water was issued in February 2008.

The first floating solar installation was in Aichi, Japan, in 2007, built by the National Institute of Advanced Industrial Science and Technology.

In May 2008, the Far Niente Winery in Oakville, California, installed 994 modules (175 kW) on 130 pontoons on its irrigation pond. Several small-scale floating PV farms were built over the next seven years. The first megawatt-scale plant was commissioned in July 2013 at Okegawa, Japan.

The Solar Energy Industries Association (SEIA) and GTM Research (later acquired by Wood Mackenzie) reported that 7.3 megawatts of SPV was installed in the US during 2015.

In 2016, Kyocera developed what was then the world's largest, a 13.4 MW farm on the reservoir above Yamakura Dam in Chiba Prefecture using 50,000 panels. The Huainan plant, inaugurated in May 2017 in China, occupies more than 800000 m^{2} on a former quarry lake, capable of producing up to 40 MW.

That same year, in the UK, which claims the largest floating array in Europe at its Queen Elizabeth II Reservoir in Walton-on-Thames; MP Alan Whitehead stated to CNBC that solar power was becoming central to his country's power production.

Global installed capacity grew from 1 GW in 2018 to 13 GW in 2022, mostly in Asia. By 2020, costs associated with floating and land-based solar had narrowed to near parity.

In 2022, China added the largest floating PV plant in the world, Huaneng Power International (HPI), a 320 MW facility in Dezhou, Shandong, expected to produce around 150 GWh annually. In 2023, global solar capacity grew by 22%, reaching 1,200 GW.

Floating panels rise in popularity during the 2020s can be attributed to its increased energy yield and efficiency, when compared to land-based systems, especially in countries where land costs and environmental impact legislation hinders development.

C.J. et al. 2024 reported that FPVs generate 0.6% to 4.4% more energy and deliver efficiency improvements ranging from 0.1% to 4.45% over its mounted solar installations.

In 2024, FPV installations withstood both Typhoon Yagi when, strengthened into Super Typhoon Capricorn, it struck Zhanjiang, Guangdong, China, and Hurricane Milton in the US . D3Energy's 10 floating installations along the path of the storm were undamaged, whereas mounted panels in Florida were widely damaged by the hurricane.

Global Industry Analysts (GIA) forecast a compounded annual growth rate (CAGR) of 33.7% in FPVs by 2026. The FPV market is expected to grow into a $10 billion industry by 2030, with a CAGR of 14.5%.

The Austrian company Swimsol installed the world's first offshore floating solar PV system at sea in 2014, a 15 kWp pilot in the Maldives developed in cooperation with the Vienna University of Technology and the Fraunhofer-Gesellschaft. In 2019, Oceans of Energy (Netherlands) installed the first offshore floating solar farm in open, rough-sea conditions in the Dutch North Sea, where it survived multiple winter storms.

== Marine installations ==
Salt-water resistant floating farms are constructed for ocean use. Floating solar can have positive and negative effects on the ocean environment: for instance, it can act as an artificial reef and provide habitat for fish and other animals. On the other hand, the panels increase shading and construction may disrupt seagrass and coral.

Marine floatovoltaics (floatPV) are floating platforms with PV arrays floating on the surface of marine water bodies, intending to capture solar radiation. This new technology is still in its infancy and not commonly used on a global scale, but it comes packed with merits and demerits, such as structures serving as artificial reefs and also being able to offer substrates for marine organisms; this can contribute to biodiversity, fish aggregation and potential spill-over effects to neighbouring environments.

Also, in some models, although large FPV arrays may not cause significant increases in net primary production, they can result in a decrease in water turbidity, but they also support decarbonisation without using terrestrial habitat space and may be enhanced by the efficiency of water serving as a coolant. Meanwhile, FPV arrays can reduce sun exposure to seagrass and coral reefs in sensitive areas, which can lead to the rapid growth of invasive species in aquatic life.

The human activity-labour procedures of anchoring, installation, fastening cables and mechanisms can lead to disturbance of hydro bed sediments as well as damage through scour, and may pose risks to benthic communities; the installation of anchors is a potential avenue for future corrosion and water pollution. Hence, because of the inherent risks to aquatic life, periodic observation and site analysis are necessary; There must be long-term monitoring for a balance between energy and ecosystem protection.

== Lake installations ==
FPV systems are increasingly installed on lakes, reservoirs, and canals as an alternative to land-based solar installations. These systems save land, maintain higher panel efficiency due to water cooling, and reduce sun-driven evaporation. FPVs can be installed on artificial lakes, irrigation basins, and reservoirs, and are particularly suitable for locations near towns that are not in protected areas and that do not dry up or freeze for long periods.

An international study estimated the global potential of FPV on lakes and reservoirs. Out of more than 1 million water bodies larger than 0.1 km^{2}, 67,893 sites met the criteria for implementation. Assuming 10% coverage of these water surfaces, floating photovoltaics could generate approximately 1,302 TWh per year worldwide. Major potential contributors are China (252 TWh), Brazil (170 TWh), and the US (153 TWh). In smaller countries such as Papua New Guinea, Ethiopia, and Rwanda, FPV could satisfy most electricity demand. Bolivia and Tonga could meet 87% and 92% of demand, respectively. In Europe, Finland and Denmark show the highest potential, with 17% and 7% of electricity demand coverage, respectively.

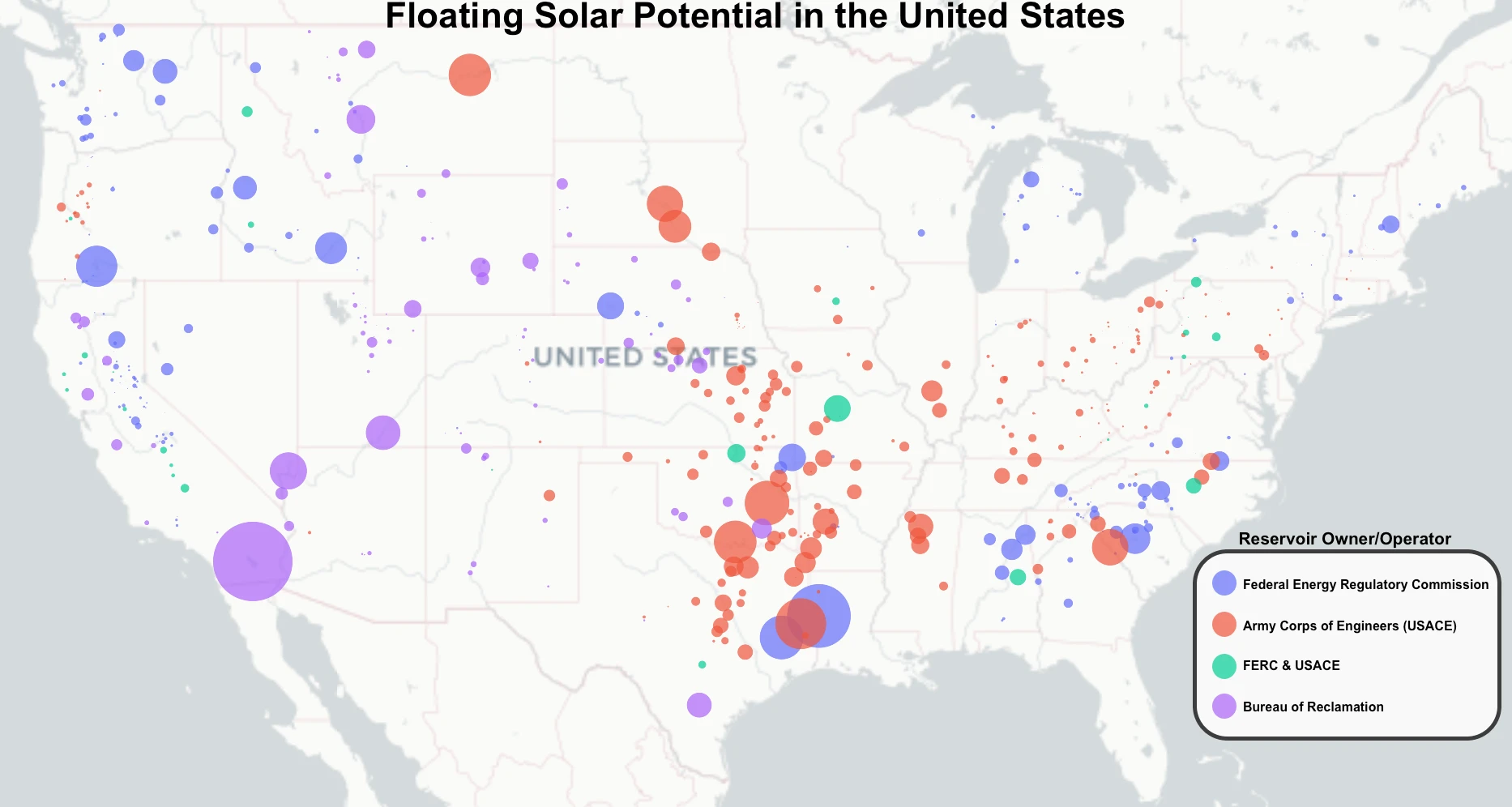
Reservoir owner/operator & power potential Federal Energy Regulatory Commission Army Corps of Engineers (USACE) FERC & USACE United States Bureau of Reclamation

Floating solar on Federally owned reservoirs in the US has the potential to generate 1,476 terawatt hours annually. The shading from floating solar could help mitigate evaporation from reservoirs also.

== Installation ==
The construction process for a floating solar project includes installing anchors and mooring lines that attach to the waterbed or shore, assembling floats and panels into rows and sections onshore, and then pulling the sections by boat to the mooring lines and secured into place.

While overall costs for a floating system neared parity ground-mounted systems by 2020, installation was about 10-25% higher in 2023. According to a researcher at the National Renewable Energy Laboratory (NREL), this increase is primarily due to the need for anchoring systems to secure the panels on water.

== Technological innovations ==
=== Vertical floating photovoltaics ===
Vertical floating photovoltaics (VFPV) place panels vertically. A project developed by SINN Power uses 2,600 vertically mounted bifacial modules in an east–west orientation, with corridors of at least four meters between rows. The installation features a keel-based substructure that extends up to 1.6 meters below the surface, secured to a network of cables, allowing controlled movement under wind pressure while maintaining stability with changing water levels.

The VFPV system produces electricity that better matches daily consumption peaks, generating more energy in the morning and late afternoon. Seasonal data indicate that vertical bifacial modules can improve energy yield by 7–10% on average and up to 27% during early morning and late afternoon hours. The plant is expected to generate around 2 GWh per year, with neutral to positive ecological effects, shown by nearby nesting waterfowl and fish.

== Advantages ==
Several factors support this approach:

- No land occupancy – The main advantage of floating PV plants is that they do not take up any land, except the limited surfaces necessary for electric cabinet and grid connections. Their price is comparable with land based plants, but floatovoltaics provide a good way to avoid land consumption.
- Installation, decommissioning and maintenance – Floating PV plants are more compact than land-based plants, their management is simpler and their construction and decommissioning straightforward. The main point is that no fixed structures exist like the foundations used for a land-based plant so their installation can be totally reversible. Furthermore, panels installed on water basins require less maintenance in particular when compared with installation on ground with dusty soil. As arrays are assembled at a single shore point before being moved into place, installations can be faster than ground-mounted arrays.
- Water conservation and water quality – Partial coverage of water basins can reduce water evaporation. This result depends on climate conditions and on the percentage of the covered surface. In arid climates such as parts of India this is an important advantage since about 30% of the evaporation of the covered surface is saved. This may be greater in Australia, and is a very useful feature if the basin is used for irrigation purposes. Water conservation from FPV is substantial and can be used to protect disappearing terminal natural lakes and other bodies of fresh water. This positions FPV as a practical approach for renewable energy generation in regions facing water scarcity. For example, a case study of Lake Nasser, which is in a region that suffers from water poverty, found that 50% coverage would result in 61.71% or 9.07 billion m^{3} annual water evaporation savings.
- Increased panel efficiency due to cooling – the cooling effect of the water close to the PV panels leads to an energy gain that ranges from 5% to 15%. Natural cooling can be increased by a water layer on the PV modules or by submerging them, the so-called SP2 (Submerged Photovoltaic Solar Panel).
- Tracking – Large floating platforms can easily be rotated horizontally and vertically to enable Sun-tracking (similar to sunflowers). Moving solar arrays uses little energy and doesn't need a complex mechanical apparatus like land-based PV plants. Equipping a floating PV plant with a tracking system costs little extra while the energy gain can range from 15% to 25%.
- Environment control – Algal blooms, a serious problem in industrialized countries, may be reduced when greater than 40% of the surface is covered. Coverage of water basins reduces light just below the surface, reducing algal photosynthesis and growth. Active pollution control remains important for water management.
- Utilization of areas already exploited by human activity – Floating solar plants can be installed over water basins artificially created such as flooded mine pits or hydroelectric power plants. In this way it is possible to exploit areas already influenced by the human activity to increase the impact and yield of a given area instead of using other land.
- Hybridization with hydroelectric power plants –
  A: Sun. B: Floating panels. C: Inverter. D: Electric connection cabinet. E: electricity grid. F: water intake. G: pumped water canal. H: pump/turbine body. I: discharge.
  Floating solar is often installed on existing hydropower. This allows for additional benefits and cost reductions such as using the existing transmission lines and distribution infrastructure. FPV provides a potentially profitable means of reducing water evaporation in the world's at-risk bodies of fresh water. Furthermore, it is possible to install floating photovoltaic panels on the water basins of a pumped-storage hydroelectric power plant. The hybridization of solar photovoltaic with pumped storage is beneficial in rising the capability of the two plant combined because the pumped hydroelectric plant can be used to store the high but unstable amount of electricity coming from the solar PV, making the water basin acting as a battery for the solar photovoltaic plant. For example, a case study of Lake Mead found that if 10% of the lake was covered with FPV, there would be enough water conserved and electricity generated to service Las Vegas and Reno combined. At 50% coverage, FPV would provide over 127 TWh of clean solar electricity and 633.22 million m^{3} of water savings, which would provide enough electricity to retire 11% of the polluting coal-fired plants in the US and provide water for over five million Americans, annually.

== Disadvantages ==
Floating solar presents several challenges to designers:

- Electrical safety and long-term reliability of system components: Operating on water over its entire service life, the system is required to have significantly increased corrosion resistance and long-term floatation capabilities (redundant, resilient, distributed floats), particularly when installed over salt water.
- Waves: The floating PV system (wires, physical connections, floats, panels) needs to be able to withstand relatively higher winds (than on land) and heavy waves, particularly in off-shore or near-shore installations.
- Maintenance complexity: Operation and maintenance activities are, as a general rule, more difficult to perform on water than on land.
- Floating technology complexity: Floating PV panels have to be installed over floating platforms such as pontoons or floating piers. This technology was not initially developed for accommodating solar modules thus needs to be designed specifically for that purpose.
- Anchoring technology complexity: Anchoring the floating panels is fundamental in order to avoid abrupt variation of panels position that would hinder the production. Anchoring technology is well known and established when applied to boats or other floating objects but it needs to be adapted to the usage with floating PV. Severe storms have caused floating systems to fail and anchoring systems must be developed with these risks in mind.
- Societal use conflicts: Covering bodies of water with floating panels may interfere with societal uses. For example, covering reservoirs used for fisheries could undermine local populations reliant on those fisheries. The impact on scenery by floating panels may lower property prices causing opposition from nearby landowners. One survey conducted with the local population of Oostvoornse lake, the Netherlands, demonstrated a 10% disapproval rate of short-term Floating PV projects in their community. These concerns included obstruction of businesses and recreational activities in the lake area. Other surveyors showed concerns of floating solar technology ruining the lake's natural beauty, and disregarding the local people's personal attachments to Oostvoornse lake.
- Ecological challenges: The shading of bodies of water may inhibit harmful algal blooms, but the shade of floating PV panels may cause ecological damage via inhibiting photosynthesis and altering the behavior of light-responsive fish and zooplankton. Furthermore, the emission of polarized light by PV systems can affect animals sensitive to polarized light like many insects, birds, or amphibians.

== Largest floating solar facilities ==
Floating photovoltaic power stations (5 MW and larger)
| PV power station | Location | Country | Nominal power (MW_{p}) | Year | Notes |
|---|---|---|---|---|---|
| Dongying HG14 | Shandong | China | 1000 | 2025 | 100 MW/200 MWh battery |
| Anhui Fuyang Southern Wind-solar-storage | Fuyang, Anhui | China | 650 | 2023 | |
| Wenzhou Taihan | Wenzhou, Zhejiang | China | 550 | 2021 | |
| Chang-Bin | Changhua | Taiwan | 440 | | |
| Dezhou Dingzhuang | Dezhou, Shandong | China | 320 | | +100 MW windpower |
| Cirata | Purwakarta, West Java | Indonesia | 192 | 2023 | +1000 MW hydroelectricity |
| Three Gorges | Huainan City, Anhui | China | 150 | 2019 | |
| NTPC Ramagundam (BHEL) | Peddapalli, Telangana | India | 145 | | |
| Xinji Huainan | Xinji Huainan | China | 102 | 2017 | |
| Yuanjiang Yiyang | Yiyang, Hunan | China | 100 | 2019 | |
| NTPC Kayamkulam | Kayamkulam, Kerala | India | 92 | | |
| Omkareshwar Floating Solar Power Park | Khandwa, Madhya Pradesh | India | 90 | 2024 | |
| Les Îlots Blandin | Perthes, Haute-Marne | France | 74 | 2025 | |
| CECEP | Suzhou, Anhui | China | 70 | 2019 | |
| Tengeh | | Singapore | 60 | 2021 | |
| 304 Industrial Park | Prachinburi | Thailand | 60 | 2023 | |
| Huancheng Jining | Huancheng Jining | China | 50 | 2018 | |
| Da Mi Reservoir | Binh Thuan province | Vietnam | 47.5 | 2019 | |
| Sirindhorn Dam | Ubon Ratchathani | Thailand | 45 | 2021 | |
| Hapcheon Dam | South Gyeongsang | South Korea | 40 | | |
| Anhui GCL | | China | 32 | | |
| HaBonim Reservoir | Ma'ayan Tzvi | Israel | 31 | 2023 | |
| NTPC Simhadri (BHEL) | Vizag, Andhra Pradesh | India | 25 | | |
| Ubol Ratana Dam | Khon Kaen | Thailand | 24 | 2024 | |
| NTPC Kayamkulam (BHEL) | Kayamkulam, Kerala | India | 22 | | |
| Former sand pit site | Grafenwörth | Austria | 24.5 | 2023 | |
| Qintang Guigang | Guping Guangxi | China | 20 | 2016 | |
| Lazer | Hautes-Alpes | France | 20 | 2023 | |
| Burgata | | Israel | 13.5 | 2022 | |
| NJAW Canoe Brook | Millburn, New Jersey | United States | 8.9 | 2022 | |

== Gallery ==
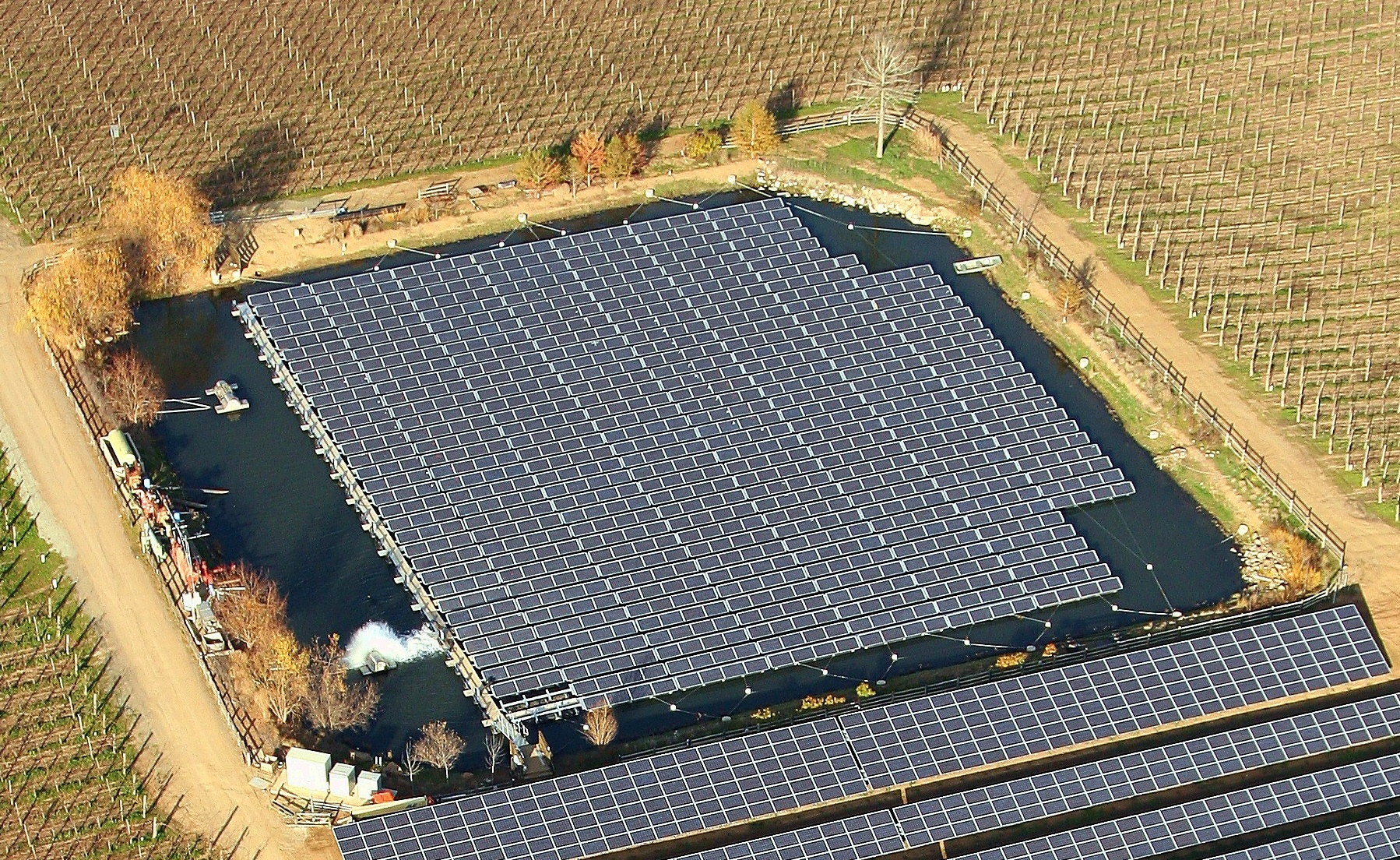

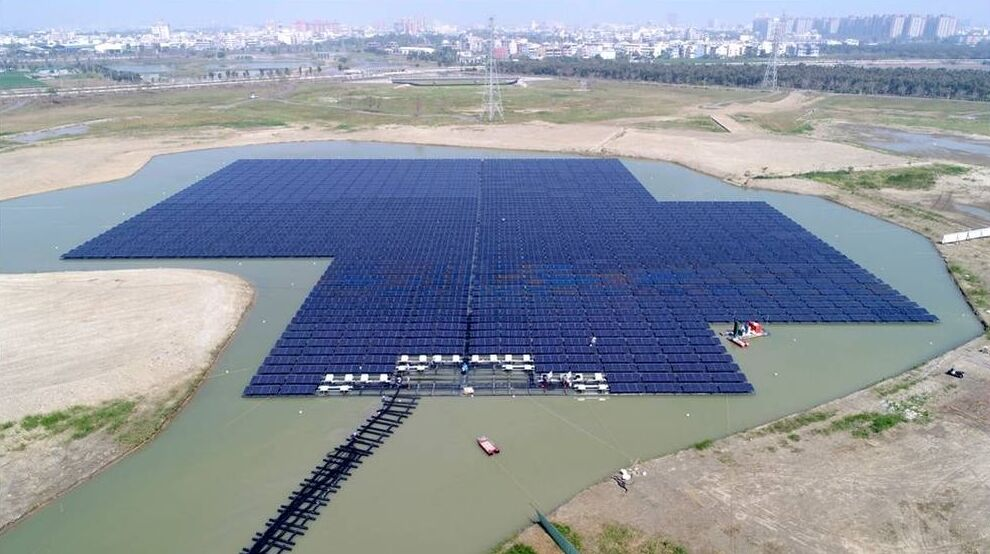

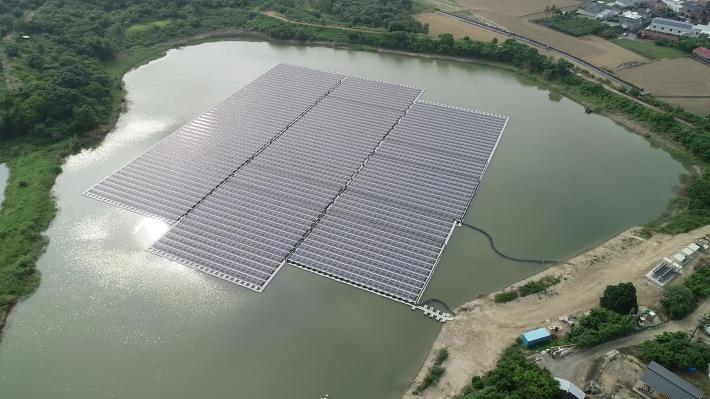

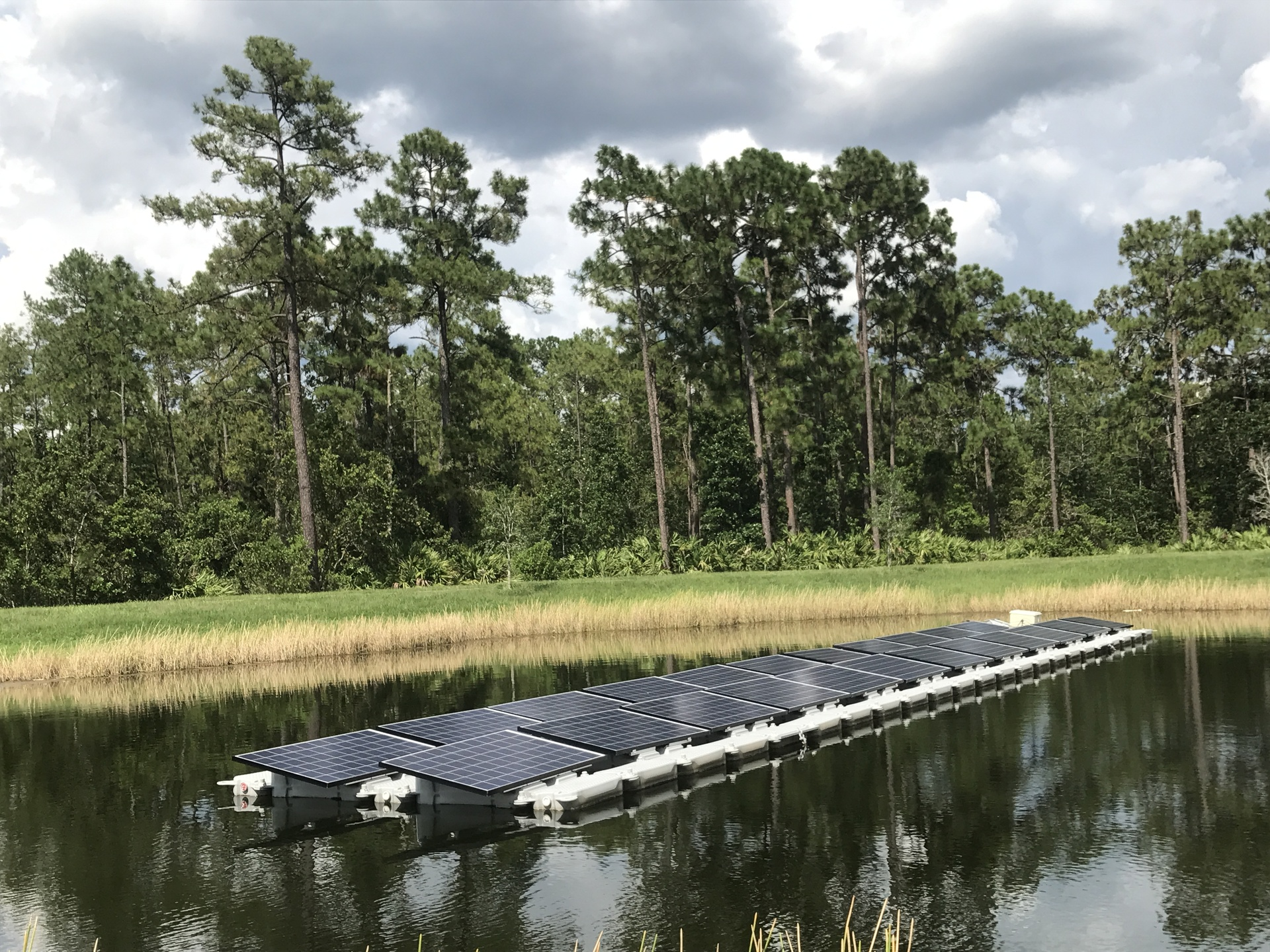

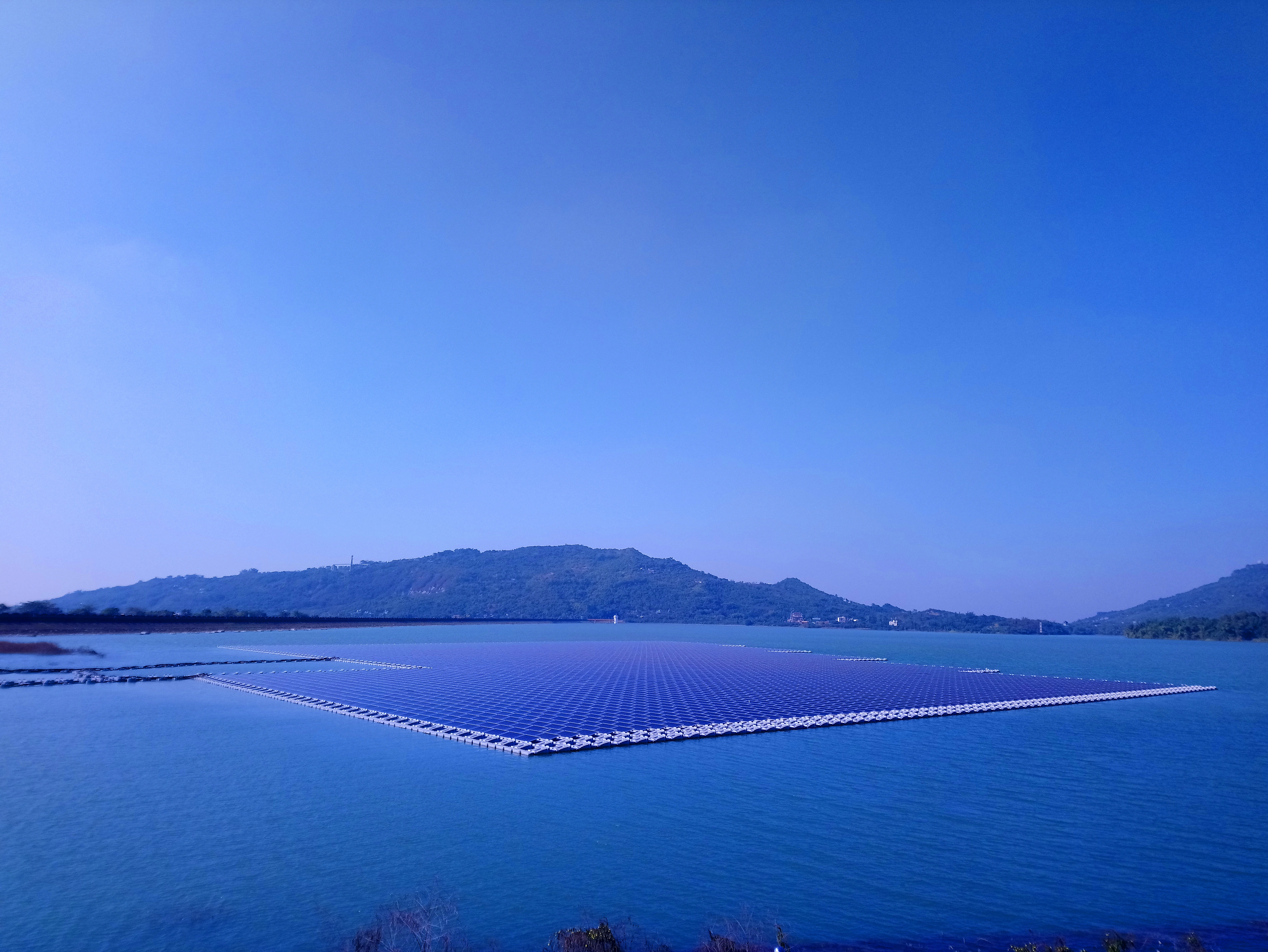

== See also ==
- Agrivoltaics
- Solar canal
- Solar energy
- Vertical bifacial solar cells
