= D3Energy =

Floating solar (FPV) developer

D3Energy, Inc.
- Industry: Electric power industry; Energy development; Renewable energy; Floating Solar (FPV)
- Founded: 2013
- Founder: Lowell S. Dunn II
- Headquarters: Miami, FL
- Area served: Worldwide
- Key people: Lowell S. Dunn II, President and CEO; Stetson Tchividjian, Managing director; John Hernandez, Vice president
- Products: Electricity, floating photovoltaic power plants
- Website: www.d3energy.com

D3Energy is a developer of floating solar projects in the United States. Founded in 2013, the company partners with French manufacturer Ciel & Terre (founded in 2006), to provide engineering, project development, operations and maintenance, financing, procurement and construction services for its floating system, Hydrelio.

== History ==
In 2013, D3Energy entered into a partnership with the French company Ciel & Terre to develop and distribute floating solar in the United States, predominantly in Florida and New Jersey. Ciel & Terre holds the first patent for industrialized, water-based PV technology, branded Hydrelio HDPE-floats, which it began developing as large-scale solar power plants in 2006; it has provided floating solar array systems since 2011.

== Projects ==
On February 18, 2017, Ciel & Terre and D3 Energy installed a 31.5 kWp floating array in Central Florida for the Orlando Utilities Commission (OUC) and the largest floating solar photovoltaic system in Florida to date.

Completed in 2024, D3Energy installed the first floating PV array in Ohio, for Del-Co Water, a central state water utility with operations in eight counties, using Ciel & Terre's trade-marked Hydrelio floating system, along with rooftop and carport installations. Located at the Signal Hill Water Treatment Plant, the facility was completed in September, and opened in December 2024, the new FPV offsets about half of the electricity required by the water treatment plant.

The company also installed the first PVF in Utah, completed in September 2024, in conjunction with Ameresco, to be operated by the Mountain Regional Water Special Service District.

In the aftermath of Hurricane Milton in Florida, in 2024, the company reported that its 10 installations in the path of the storm remained undamaged and fully operational; mounted solar panels in Florida were widely damaged by the hurricane.

In 2024, the company completed FPV installations for Orange County Utilities' Southern Regional Water Supply Facility in the southeast United States, and in New Zealand.
