= Unirac =

North American solar power company

- Company type: Private
- Industry: Energy Development
- Founded: 1998, acquired 2010
- Headquarters: Albuquerque, New Mexico, United States
- Key people: Peter Lorenz, CEO; Tom Miller, CFO; Sean Linn, COO
- Products: Photovoltaic system
- Website: www.unirac.com

Unirac is a North American solar power infrastructure provider that has a 30 percent share of the North American solar racking market.

Unirac's customers include the Google campus, Mineta San Jose International Airport, BJ's Wholesale Club, Universal Studios Hollywood, the Orange County Convention Center and the Minneapolis-St. Paul Convention Center. The company provides its products through distributors in California, New Mexico, New York, Vermont, Arizona, Rhode Island, and Australia, as well as Unirac Canada, a subsidiary.

Unirac designs and tests its products in Albuquerque, New Mexico, and manufactures them in United States and Ontario, Canada. Unirac solutions meet "Buy American", ARRA and Ontario Power Authority FIT (Feed-in Tariff) and microFIT criteria. More than 90 percent of the company's supply chain is US-based.

Unirac has been established as a rapid racking system with DNV GL verifying Unirac's Roof Mount (RM) Installs at 12 Modules Per Man Hour.

Their distribution network for solar products includes 88 distributors and wholesalers, in eleven countries.

== History ==
Unirac, Inc. was founded in 1998 and is based in Albuquerque, New Mexico. The company was acquired in May 2010 by Liechtenstein's Hilti Group, a construction tool supplier. Unirac was sold by the Hilti Group in 2016 to Tenex Capital Management and continues to operate under the Unirac name.

Unirac has achieved International Organization for Standardization (ISO) 14001:2004 certification for Environmental Management Systems (EMS) and ISO 9001:2008 certification for Quality Management Systems (QMS). It was the first solar infrastructure company to secure both certifications.

== See also ==
- Photovoltaic system
- Photovoltaic mounting system
- Photovoltaics companies
