= Agrivoltaics =

Simultaneous agriculture and solar energy production

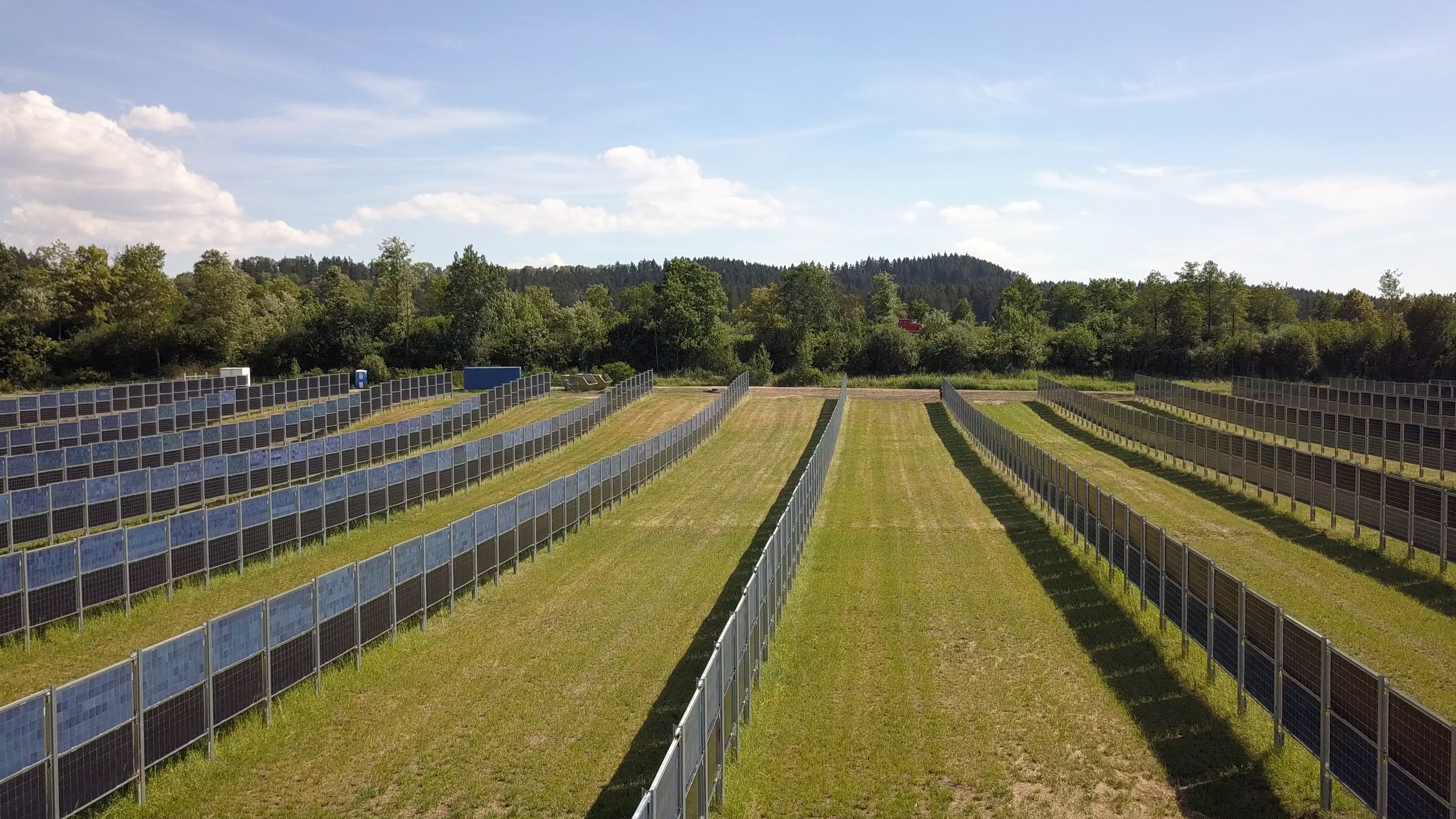
Vertical solar panels, east-to-west orientation, with bifacial modules, near Donaueschingen, Germany

Agrivoltaics (also called agrophotovoltaics, agrisolar, or dual-use solar) refers to the practice of using the same land for both solar energy and agriculture.

There are a range of approaches. For example, solar panels can be installed between crops, elevated above crops, on greenhouses, or arranged to support pollinators.

Because solar panels consume light, there can be trade-offs between crop yield, crop quality, and energy production. Some crops can benefit from the increased shade, obviating the trade-off, such as green leafy vegetables, and spices such as turmeric and ginger, whereas staple crops such as wheat, rice, soybeans or pulses require more sun.

The combination can offer a range of synergies. Solar panels can help by lowering crop temperatures, providing shelter for livestock and helping plants retain moisture. For farmers, the ability to produce electricity can help diversify their income stream, and improve land use efficiency.

Agrivoltaics has also been used at scale in arid and semi-arid regions to stabilize soils, reduce dust storm intensity, increase vegetation cover, provide forage for livestock, and curb desertification, notably in northern China.

== Terminology ==
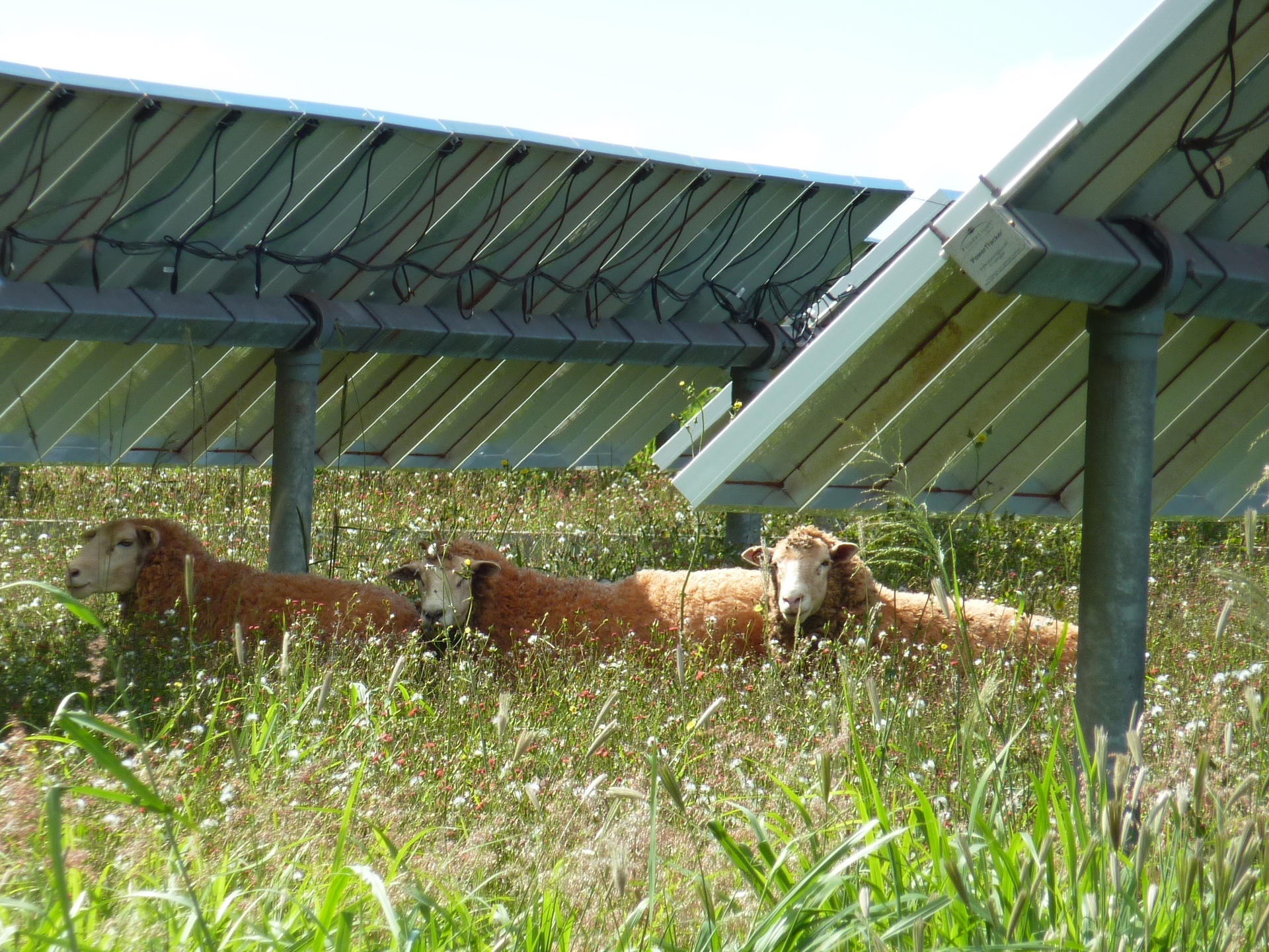
Sheep under solar panels in Lanai, Hawaii

The term agrivoltaic was coined by Dupraz et al in 2011. The concept has also been called "agrophotovoltaics" in one German report, and a term translating as "solar sharing" has been used in Japanese.

In Europe and Asia, where the concept was pioneered, the term agrivoltaics is applied to technology designed for dual use. This can involve solar panels above crops – often featuring a system of mounts or cables to raise the height of the solar array in order to allow access by farm machinery – or solar paneling on the roofs of greenhouses.

By 2019, some authors had begun using the term agrivoltaics to include any agricultural activity among solar arrays, including conventional solar arrays not originally intended for dual use. For example, sheep can be grazed among conventional solar arrays without modification. Likewise, some apply the term to solar panels on the roofs of barns or livestock sheds.

Agrisolar co-location is the integration and co-management of solar and agricultural production. Agrisolar thus includes agrivoltaics, as well as adjacent co-location—where solar is installed within and adjacent to agriculture to enhance economic resilience, offset operational costs, and save irrigation water.

Ecovoltaics involves solar installations intended to co-prioritize energy production and ecosystem services.

Floating solar (floatovoltaics) and solar canals involve placing solar on existing bodies of water or water infrastructure. These systems can reduce evaporation losses and increase panel efficiency through evaporative cooling.

Planting trees in association with solar panels has been termed silvovoltaics.

== System design ==
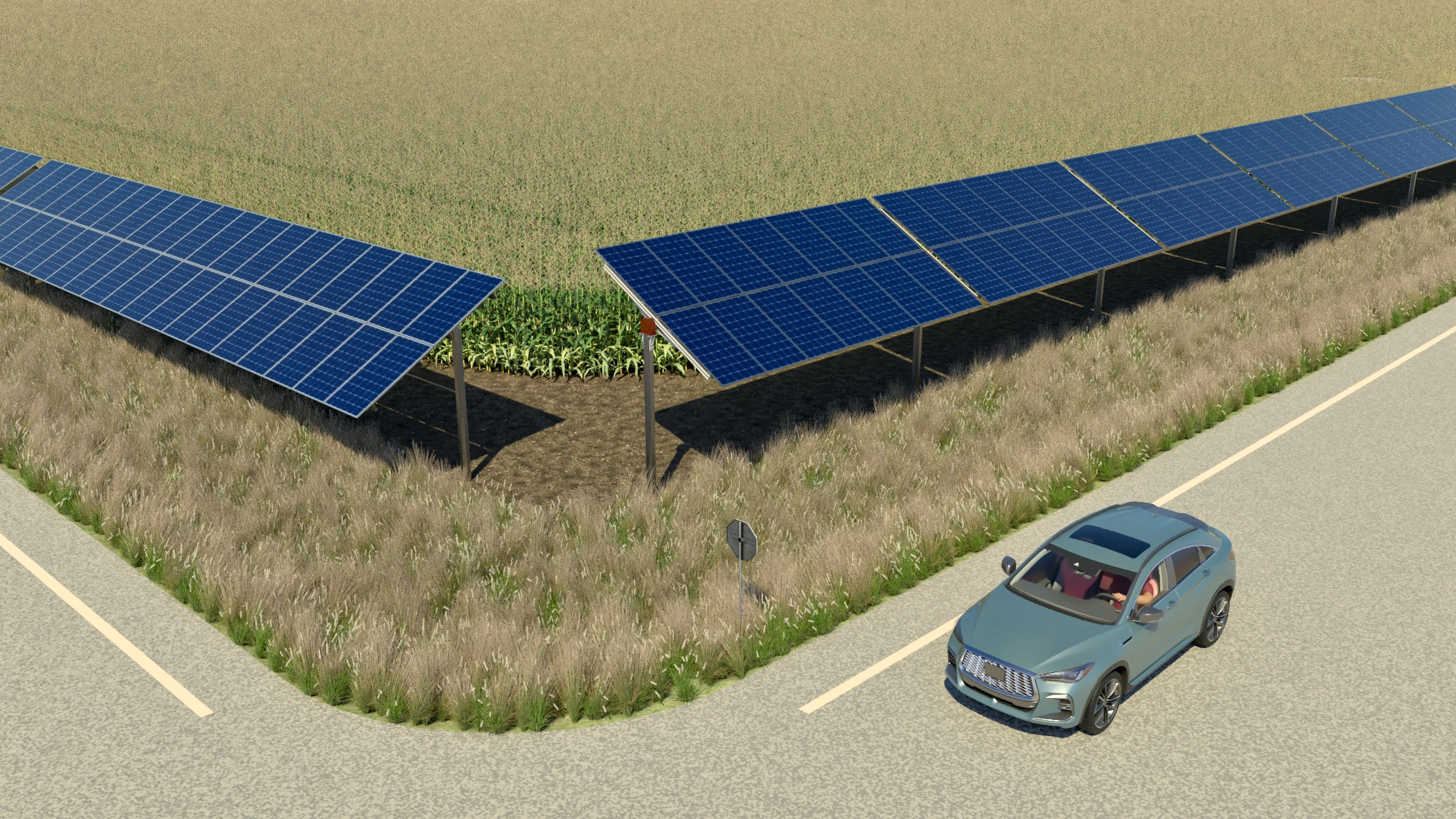
3D design of a south-facing solar array (left) and a horizontal axis array (right) on the edge of a corn field

Solar panels can be placed between crops, above crops, or on greenhouses. There are a variety of options for how the panels are set up.

For any system, planners consider several variables to maximize solar energy absorption by panels and crops. The most important is the angle of the panels. Other factors include panel heights, solar irradiance and climate. In their pioneering 1982 paper, Goetzberger and Zastrow published a number of ideas on how to optimize agrivoltaic installations in the Northern Hemisphere, including the orientation of panels and ensuring crops receive enough light.

Experimental facilities typically have a control agricultural area without solar panels, for comparison with the agrivoltaic area, to study the effects of the panels on crop development.

=== Fixed panels ===
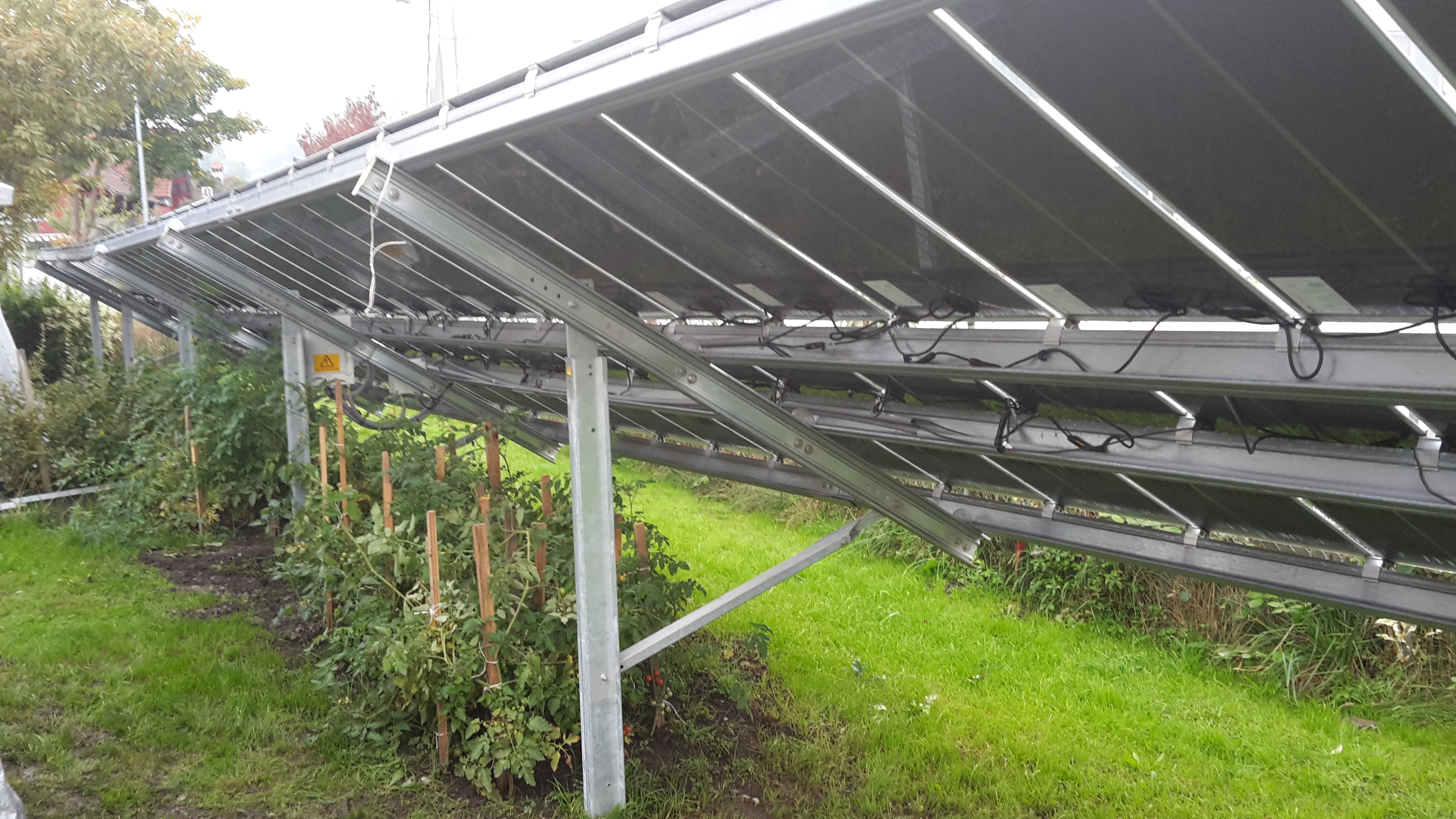
Tomatoes under solar panels in Dornbirn, Austria

Most conventional systems install angled solar panels on greenhouses, above field crops or between field crops.

=== Vertical systems ===
Vertically mounted systems with bifacial modules can be installed on fences or on separate supports. One module is typically mounted between fenceposts. The yield for a vertical south-facing panel is 76%, often yielding a lower levelized cost. One study reported that microinverters had better performance when the cross-over fence length was under 30 meters or when the system was small, whereas string inverters were better for longer fences. A simulation study reported that the distance between module rows significantly affects panel output. Open-source wood-based racking constructed from sustainable materials can be made with hand tools. The racks offer a 25-year lifetime to match the panels and can weather high wind speeds and heavy snow loads.

=== Integrated ===
An integrated system that utilizes a hydrogel can work as an atmospheric water generator, condensing water vapor at night for irrigation or to cool the panel.

=== Dynamic ===
The earliest agrivoltaic system was built in Japan using panels mounted on thin pipes on stands without concrete footings. This system was dismountable and lightweight, and the panels can be moved or adjusted across the seasons. Wide spacing reduced wind resistance.

Alternatively, a sun tracking system can automatically optimize the orientation of the panels to emphasize agricultural production or electricity production. For example single axis trackers can be spaced apart and oriented vertically to enable farm equipment to operate normally between them while capturing substantial energy (e.g. less than 0.5% of US farmland would be needed with such trackers to cover all data center energy needs).

In 2004 Czaloun proposed a tracking system with a rope rack. Panels can be reoriented. The first prototype was built in 2007 in Austria. REM Tec deployed plants equipped with dual-axis tracking systems in Italy and China. They have developed an equivalent system for greenhouses.

Sun'R and Agrivolta are developing single-axis tracking systems incorporating plant growth models, weather forecasts, calculation and optimization software. The Agrivolta device is equipped with south-facing panels that can be removed by a sliding system. A Japanese company developed a separate tracking system.

Insolight is developing translucent modules with an integrated tracking system that allows the modules to remain static. The module uses lenses to concentrate light onto the panels and a dynamic transmission system to adjust the amount of light passed.

Artigianfer developed a photovoltaic greenhouse whose solar panels are installed on movable shutters.

=== Spectrally selective modules ===
Researchers have developed photovoltaic modules which constantly allow some light to pass through to plants. Ideally, these modules would let through the wavelengths needed by the interior plants, but use the other wavelengths to generate electricity. In future, these might be used in greenhouses. For example, semi-transparent PV have successfully been used to increase the yield of spicy peppers in greenhouses.

In 2015 Wen Liu proposed curved glass panels covered with a dichroitic polymer film that selectively transmits blue and red wavelengths for crop photosynthesis. All other wavelengths are reflected and concentrated on solar cells for power generation using a dual tracking system. Shadow effects are eliminated since the crops receive the wavelengths necessary for photosynthesis. Several awards have been granted such as the R&D100 prize (2017).

Selecting the optimum color tint and transparency for crop yield and electricity generation requires experimentation. Semi-transparent panels use clear backsheets to enhance food production beneath. In this option, fixed panels enable the sun to spray sunlight over the plants below, thereby reducing over-exposure.

=== Grazing ===
Agrovoltaics combined with sheep farming; a short video from Our Land and Water, New Zealand

Solar grazing involves livestock grazing beneath solar panels to control vegetation, which could shade the panels otherwise. This practice began in Britain during the 2010s.

Sheep are the most common choice for grazers. In return for keeping vegetation under control, sheep or goats receive forage and shade. System operators typically rent the sheep, which can be less expensive than mowing. Studies reported higher crop mass or lower mass but higher forage quality, achieving similar spring lamb production to open pastures. Solar grazing in Australia can yield a higher volume and quality of wool. Cattle are not used as often, partly due to concerns about them damaging the infrastructure.

In the United States, solar grazing was popularized by civil associations, fostering collaboration between ranchers and solar companies. In China, large-scale government-led initiatives and local governments negotiate with farmers and photovoltaic companies to establish agricultural photovoltaic projects. Many solar grazing projects are part of the poverty alleviation programs.

== Impacts and interactions ==
The shade produced by systems located above crops can reduce production of some crops, but such losses may be offset by the energy produced. Agrivoltaics are reported to be more advantageous in arid regions.

A 2025 systematic review of 33 studies found that agrivoltaic systems increased water-use efficiency by 20–47% and lowered air and soil temperatures by 1–4 °C; however, heavily shaded, light-dependent crops experienced yield losses.

As of 2025, no systems were known to be commercially viable outside China and Japan. The most important factor in economic viability is panel installation cost.

=== Light ===
Agrivoltaics can improve plant growth for plants which require shade in locations where sunlight is not a limiting factor. For other crops, the use of light by solar panels can reduce plant growth. For instance, wheat crops have been shown to produce lower yield in a low-light environment.

=== Water ===
Solar panels tend to conserve water. Australian trials found that solar panels can keep grass watered through condensation below the panels. In a California desert, a 14–29% savings in evaporation levels has been found due to solar panels, for shade resistant crops cucumbers and lettuce watered by irrigation. Similar research in the Arizona desert demonstrated water savings of 50% for certain crops.

In northern latitude climates, agrivoltaics are expected to change the microclimate for crops in both positive and negative manners with no net benefit, reducing quality by increasing humidity and disease, and requiring a higher expenditure on pesticides, but mitigating temperature fluctuations and thus increasing yields. In countries with low or unsteady precipitation, high temperature fluctuation and fewer opportunities for artificial irrigation, such systems are expected to beneficially affect the quality of the microclimate.

=== Heat ===
Solar panels lower the temperature of crops. In one study, the air beneath the panels stayed consistent, but land and crops had lower temperatures recorded. In Canada, a very hot summer devastated some lettuce crops, but lettuces shaded by agrivoltaics stayed over 20 °C (36 °F) cooler. In this case, agrivoltaics increased organic romaine lettuce fresh weight by over 400% compared to unshaded control plants, and by over 200% relative to the national average yield. Because of this protection from heat experiments in future climate change conditions for example showed promise for agrivoltaics to protect crops like lettuce and strawberries.

=== Crop types ===
A 2025 meta-analysis found that crop yield responses to agrivoltaic shading varied by crop species and climatic conditions, highlighting the importance of adapting system design to local growing conditions.Increased crop yield has been observed for a number of crops:

- Amaranth
- Basil
- Beans
- Broccoli
- Celery
- Chiltepin peppers
- Corn/maize
- Lettuce
- Pasture grass
- Potatoes
- Spinach
- Strawberries
- Tomatoes
- Turnips
- Wheat

=== Land use ===
Dual use for agriculture and energy production could increase the overall productivity of land. This could alleviate competition for land resources and allow for less pressure to develop farmland or natural areas into solar farms, or to convert natural areas into more farmland. Initial simulations performed by Dupraz et al in 2011 calculated that the land use efficiency may increase by 60–70% (mostly in terms of usage of solar irradiance). The central socio-political opportunities of agrivoltaics include income diversification for farmers, enhanced community relations and acceptance for PV developers, and energy demand and emissions reduction for the global population.

A disadvantage often cited as an important factor in photovoltaics in general is the substitution of food-producing farmland with solar panels. Cropland is the same type of land on which solar panels are the most efficient. Despite allowing for some agriculture to occur on the solar power plant, agrivoltaics may be accompanied by a drop in production. Although some crops in some situations, such as lettuce in California, do not appear to be affected by shading in terms of yield, some land will be sacrificed for mounting structures and systems equipment.

To address land-use conflicts between solar development and food production, some governments have implemented land-use regulations and bans. For example, China enforced restrictions in 2023, prohibiting solar installations on arable farmland and grasslands, while encouraging new projects, including agrivoltaics, to be developed on arid desert areas and other lands that are classified as having low ecological value, particularly in the country's arid northern regions.

=== Social license ===
Agrivoltaics can overcome NIMBYism for PV systems, which has been becoming an issue for renewable energy developers. A U.S. survey study assessed if public support for solar development increases when energy and agricultural production are combined in an agrivoltaic system and found 81.8% of respondents would be more likely to support solar development in their community if it integrated agricultural production. Dinesh et al.'s model claims that the value of solar generated electricity coupled to shade-tolerant crop production created an over 30% increase in economic value from farms deploying agrivoltaic systems instead of conventional agriculture. Agrivoltaics may be beneficial for summer crops due to the microclimate they create and the side effect of heat and water flow control. Agrivoltaics is environmentally superior to conventional agriculture or PV systems; a life-cycle analysis study found the pasture-based agrivoltaic system features a dual synergy that consequently produces 69.3% fewer greenhouse gas emissions and demands 82.9% less fossil energy compared to non-integrated production.

=== Energy production ===
Agrivoltaic greenhouses are less efficient than conventional solar arrays. In one study, greenhouses with half of the roof covered in panels were simulated, lowering crop output by 64% and panel output by 84%. 2025 field experiment in a tomato greenhouse in Almería, Spain, used opaque sheets to imitate solar panels covering 30% and 50% of the roof, and recorded yield reductions of 15% and 26% respectively; a preliminary economic analysis suggested electricity revenue could outweigh the crop losses.

A study reported barriers to adoption of agrivoltaics among farmers that include: uncertainty of land productivity, market potential, compensation and the need for predesigned system flexibility to accommodate different scales, types of operations, and changing farming practices.

=== Desert rehabilitation ===
Agrivoltaics has also been used to combat desertification and restore degraded arid lands, forming part of broader ecovoltaics initiatives and the "PV + ecological restoration" model.

China provides a well documented example, where modern agrivoltaics projects in its desert regions include the Kubuqi Desert, where tomatoes and desert herbs are grown under solar panels, and Ningxia province, where pilot programs cultivate goji berries. On some previously degraded land, observed impact of solar panels include increased vegetation growth, which has been attributed to the shade provided by solar panels reducing soil evaporation and wind speeds, creating microclimates conducive to plant life. Water used to clean the solar panels, also seeps to the ground, feeding the crops underneath. However unintended grass growth posed problems like blocking sunlight to solar panels, and to remedy this, operators have introduced sheep and other grazing livestock to act as natural lawnmowers, while their manure helps fertilise the soil, creating a symbiotic loop.

A 2025 peer-reviewed study published in Scientific Reports compared three desert rejuvenation models in the Hobq Desert (Kubuqui Desert), which receives only around 12 inches (~300 mm) of annual rainfall, and found that microbial activity, soil quality, and nutrient density improved significantly more under agrivoltaics, than with non-solar plantings and solar-only installations.

=== Capital cost ===
Agrivoltaics require initial investment in panel arrays, farming machinery, electric infrastructure, and possibly insurance vs conventional arrays. In Germany, capital costs make such systems difficult to finance.

A major limitation of utility-scale solar has been its land use requirements. They require substantial surface area, which can be difficult to allocate in densely populated or highly urbanised areas. As a result, large-scale solar installations, including agrivoltaics, are often located in rural areas or at a significant distance from major population centres, which may require additional infrastructure, such as upgrading the grid to accommodate high-voltage transmission lines to deliver electricity to population centres.

=== Operating cost ===
Photovoltaic systems are technically complex and may require professional assistance to maintain. In Germany, labour costs were expected to be around 3% higher.

== History ==
Adolf Goetzberger, founder of the Fraunhofer Institute for Solar Energy Systems in 1981, together with Armin Zastrow, theorised about dual usage of arable land for solar energy production and plant cultivation in 1982. The intent was to address competition for the use of arable land between solar energy production and crops.

Akira Nagashima also suggested combining solar and farming to use excess light, and developed the first prototypes in Japan in 2004.

In Europe in the early 2000s, experimental photovoltaic greenhouses were built, with part of the greenhouse roof replaced by solar panels.

In Italy (Bolzano, South Tyrol), a experimental open field agrivoltaic system was built in 2007,, being a one-axis tracking PV system using a cable support system, over-elevated over an apple orchard; followed by two other experiments in Italy (2009). Experiments in France and Germany followed.

The term "agrivoltaic" appeared for the first time in a 2011 publication.

By 2020, approximately 2.8 GW of agrivoltaic systems had been installed worldwide, of which 1.9 GW (nearly 70% of the global total) is located in China, the country with the largest share of agrivoltaic capacity.

== See also ==
- Floating solar – Solar panels mounted on a structure that floats
- Growth of photovoltaics
- Solar canal – Renewable energy source and waterway
