= Photovoltaic mounting system =

Mounting systems for solar panels

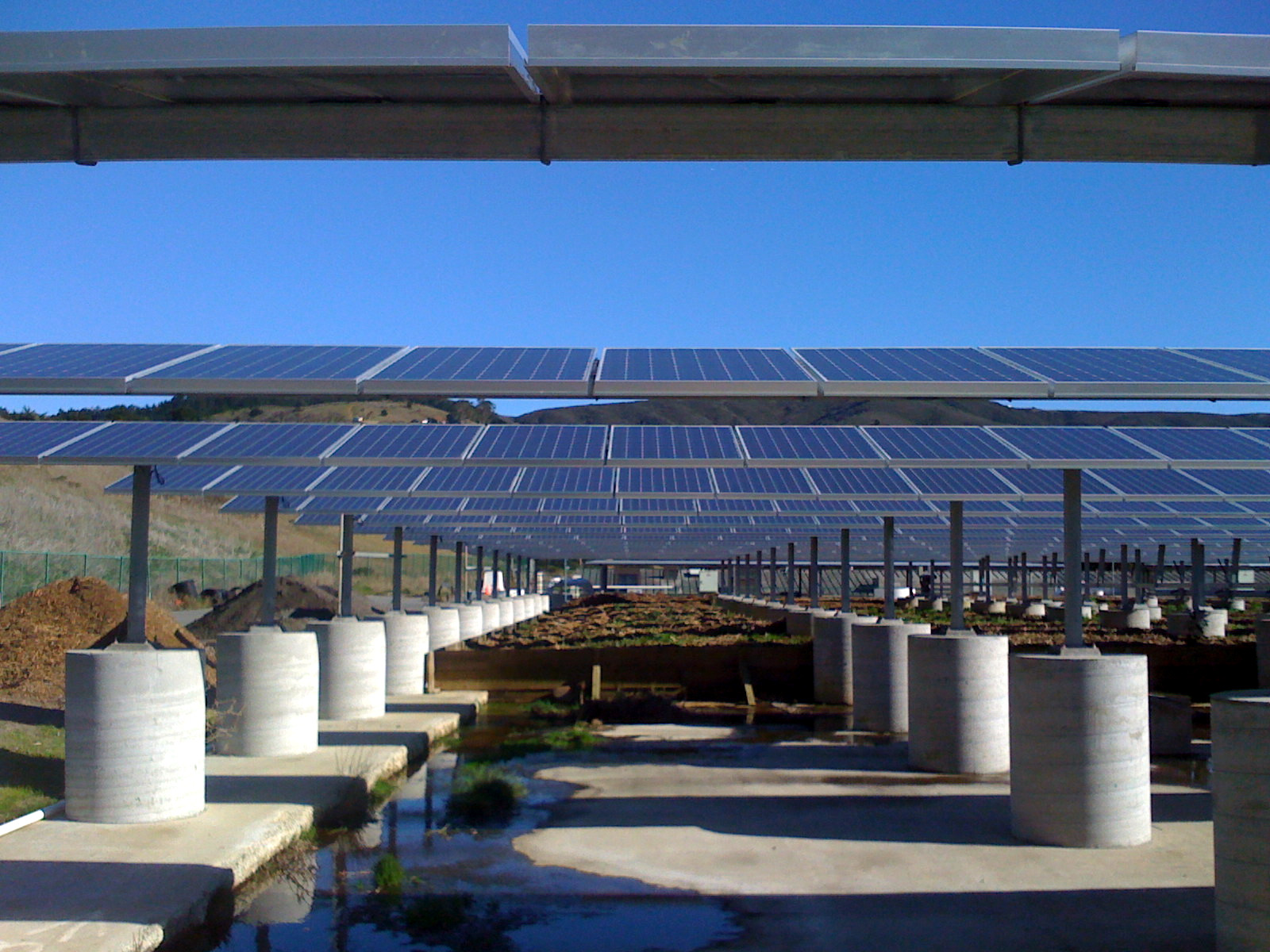
Solar panel mounting system on roof of Pacifica wastewater treatment plant

Photovoltaic mounting systems (also called solar module racking) are used to fix solar panels on surfaces like roofs, building facades, or the ground. These mounting systems generally enable retrofitting of solar panels on roofs or as part of the structure of the building (called BIPV). As the relative costs of solar photovoltaic (PV) modules has dropped, the costs of the racks have become more important and for small PV systems can be the most expensive material cost. This has caused an interest in small users deploying a DIY approach. Due to these trends, there has been an explosion of new racking trends. These include non-optimal orientations and tilt angles, new types of roof-mounts, ground mounts, canopies, building integrated, shading, vertical mounted and fencing systems.

== Orientation and inclination ==
A solar cell performs the best (most energy per unit time) when its surface is perpendicular to the sun's rays, which change continuously over the course of the day and season (see: Sun path). It is a common practice to tilt a fixed PV module (without solar tracker) at the same angle as the latitude of array's location to maximize the annual energy yield of module. For example, rooftop PV module at the tropics provides highest annual energy yield when inclination of panel surface is close to horizontal direction. A study in the tropics showed that the orientation of low-slope rooftop PV has negligible impact on annual energy yield, but in the case of PV external sunshade applications, east façade and panel slope of 30–40° are the most suitable location and inclination. Recent studies have shown non-optimal orientations such as east–west facing bifacial PV systems have some advantages.

== Mounting ==
=== Roof ===
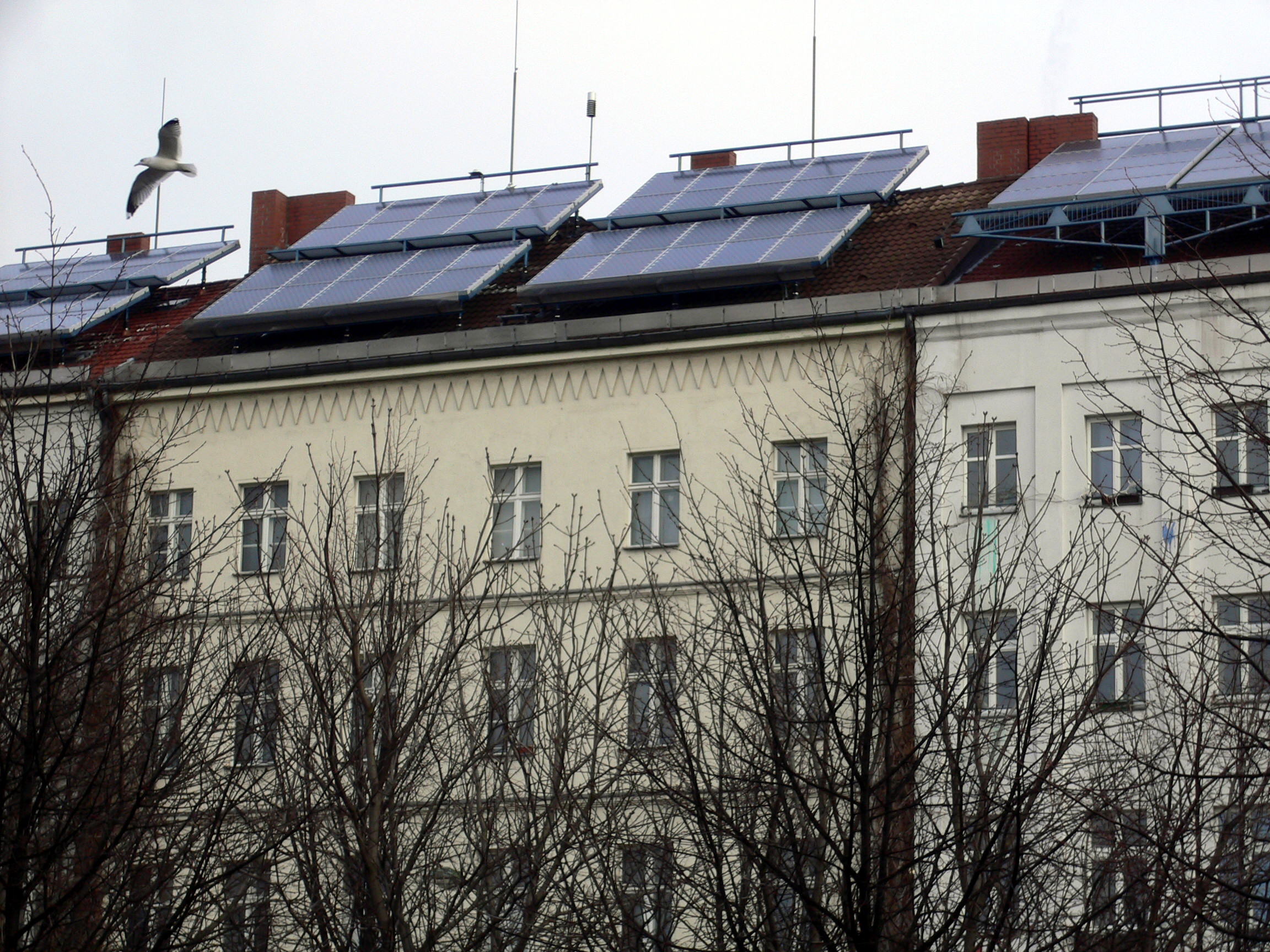
PV panels mounted on roof

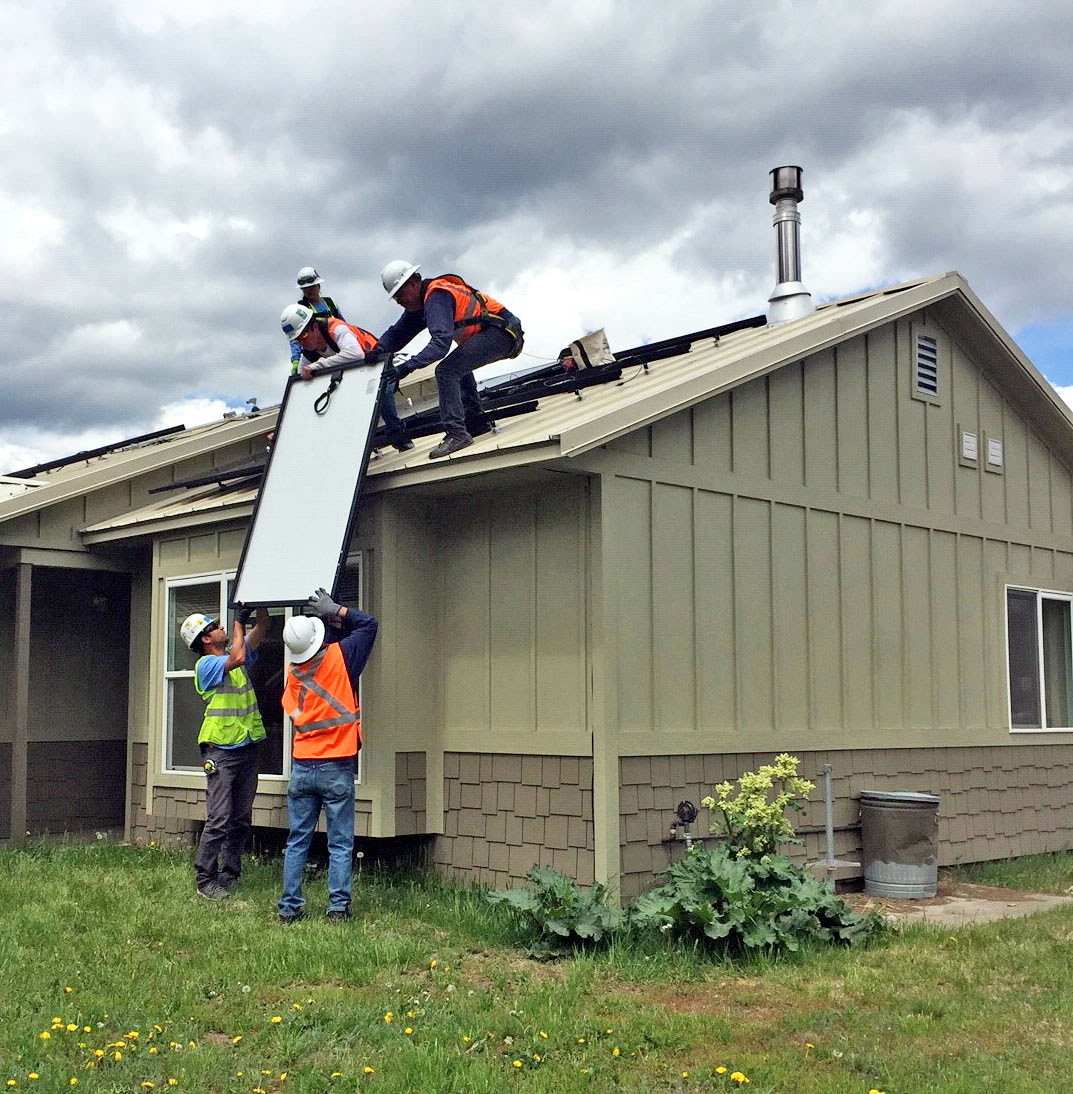
Workers install residential rooftop solar panels

The solar array of a PV system can be mounted on rooftops, generally with a few inches gap and parallel to the surface of the roof. If the rooftop is horizontal, the array is mounted with each panel aligned at an angle. If the panels are planned to be mounted before the construction of the roof, the roof can be designed accordingly by installing support brackets for the panels before the materials for the roof are installed. The installation of the solar panels can be undertaken by the crew responsible for installing the roof. If the roof is already constructed, it is relatively easy to retrofit panels directly on top of existing roofing structures. For a small minority of roofs (often not built to code) that are designed so that it is capable of bearing only the weight of the roof, installing solar panels demands that the roof structure must be strengthened beforehand. In all cases of retrofits particular consideration to weather sealing is necessary There are many low-weight designs for PV systems that can be used on either sloped or flat roofs (e.g. plastic wedges or the PV-pod), most however, rely on a type of extruded aluminum rails (e.g. Unirac). Recently, tension-based PV racking solutions have been tested successfully that reduce weight and cost. In some cases, converting to composition shingles, the weight of the removed roof materials can compensate the additional weight of the panels structure. The general practice for installation of roof-mounted solar panels include having a support bracket per hundred watts of panels.

=== Ground ===
Ground-mounted PV systems are usually large, utility-scale photovoltaic power stations. The PV array consist of solar modules held in place by racks or frames that are attached to ground-based mounting supports. In general, ground mounted PV systems can be at the optimal tilt angle and orientation (as compared to roof mounted systems that can be non-optimal particularly for retrofits).

Ground-based mounting supports include:

- Pole mounts, which are driven directly into the ground or embedded in concrete.
- Foundation mounts, such as concrete slabs or poured footings
- Ballasted footing mounts, such as concrete or steel bases that use weight to secure the solar module system in position and do not require ground penetration. This type of mounting system is well suited for sites where excavation is not possible such as capped landfills and simplifies decommissioning or relocation of solar module systems.

Ground mounts are normally consist of steel held in concrete with aluminum rails holding up aluminum modules. There are ground mounts at the residential and commercial levels, but the systems are simply smaller and the number of PV modules per column may be less (e.g. 3). In some regions like North America there is evidence that wood-based ground mounted PV racking (both fixed tilt, raised fixed tilt for trellis-based PV and variable tilt angles) can be less expensive than conventional metal racks. This is not true globally, as for example in Togo, metal racks still cost less per installed unit power even with a lower tilt angle allowing for smaller wood beams. The relative price of wood to metal radically shifts the optimal PV racking material throughout the world. This can change as wood prices have been very volatile.

=== Canopy ===
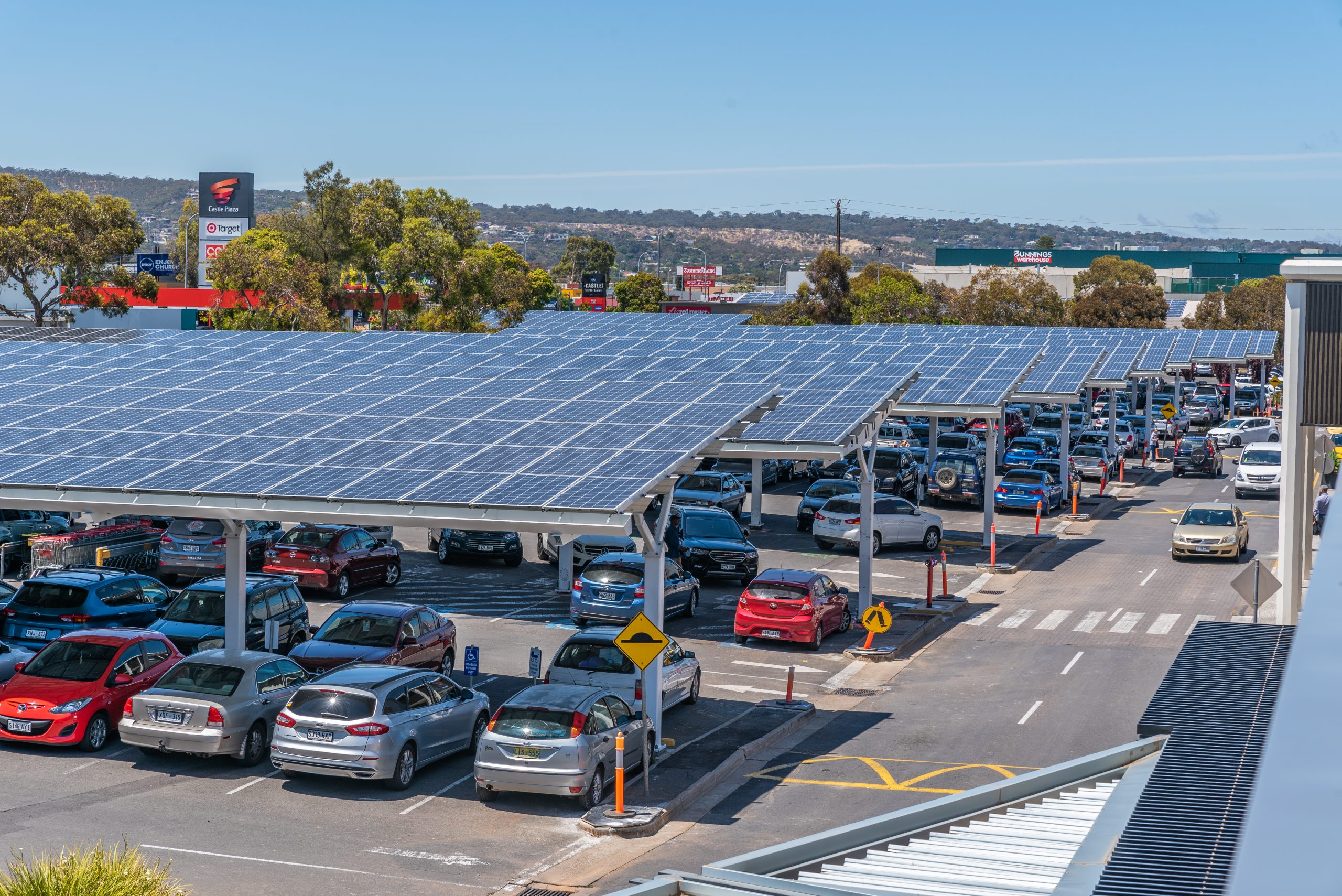
Solar canopy over a parking lot in Australia

Solar panels can be mounted on elevated racking so they can share space with other land uses, such as parking lots. These can provide shade for cars and reduce additional land use, but considerably more expensive than conventional ground-mounted systems due to the more extensive steel posts, footings and racks, as well as additional labor costs. This can be reduced somewhat by using lower cost building materials like wood. PV canopies over parking lots can be used to provide electricity for charging electric vehicles. There is substantial potential area for PV on parking lots. As for example, there is a potential 3.1 MW for PV and 100 EV charging stations per U.S. Walmart Supercenter. Popular Science reports that solar canopies built above parking lots are an increasingly common sight around the U.S.— installed at university campuses, airports, and lots near commercial office buildings. France, however, is requiring all large parking lots to be covered by solar panels.

Different canopy structures can also be used for agrivoltaics.

=== Tracking ===
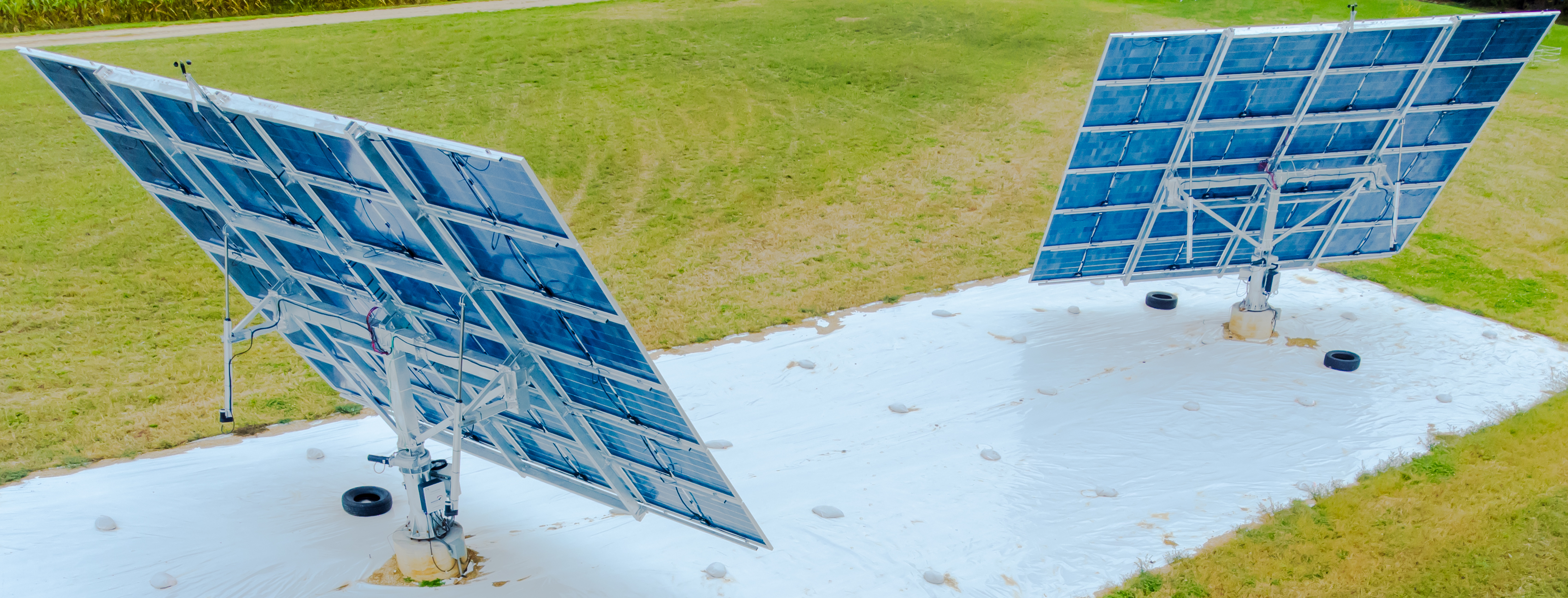
Solar tracker

Solar trackers increase the energy produced per module at the cost of mechanical complexity and increased need for maintenance. They sense the direction of the Sun and tilt or rotate the modules as needed for maximum exposure to the light.

Alternatively, fixed racks can hold modules stationary throughout the day at a given tilt (zenith angle) and facing a given direction (azimuth angle). Tilt angles equivalent to an installation's latitude are common. Some systems may also adjust the tilt angle based on the time of year.

On the other hand, east- and west-facing arrays (covering an east–west facing roof, for example) are commonly deployed. Even though such installations will not produce the maximum possible average power from the individual solar panels, the cost of the panels is now usually cheaper than the tracking mechanism and they can provided more economically valuable power during morning and evening peak demands than north or south facing systems.

=== Building integrated ===
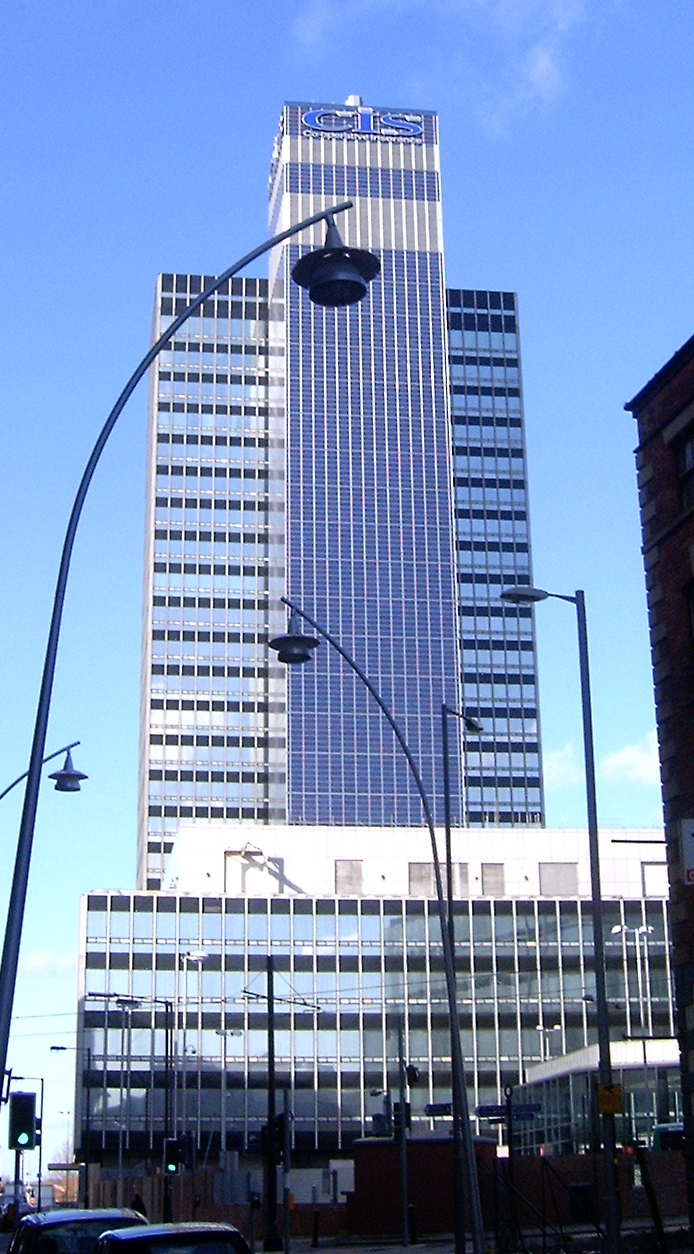
The CIS Tower in Manchester, England was clad in PV panels at a cost of £5.5 million. It started feeding electricity to the National Grid in November 2005

Building-integrated photovoltaics (BIPV) are photovoltaic materials that are used to replace conventional building materials in parts of the building envelope such as the roof (tiles), skylights, or facades. They are increasingly being incorporated into the construction of new buildings as a principal or ancillary source of electrical power, although existing buildings may be retrofitted with BIPV modules as well. The advantage of integrated photovoltaics over more common non-integrated systems is that the initial cost can be offset by reducing the amount spent on building materials and labor that would normally be used to construct the part of the building that the BIPV modules replace.

Building-adapted photovoltaics (BAPV) uses solar modules to create solar PV windows and this way, also to retrofit existing building. There are several BIPV products (e.g. PV shingles) were PV make up all of the roof material and there are methods to convert conventional modules to roof slates.

== Shade ==
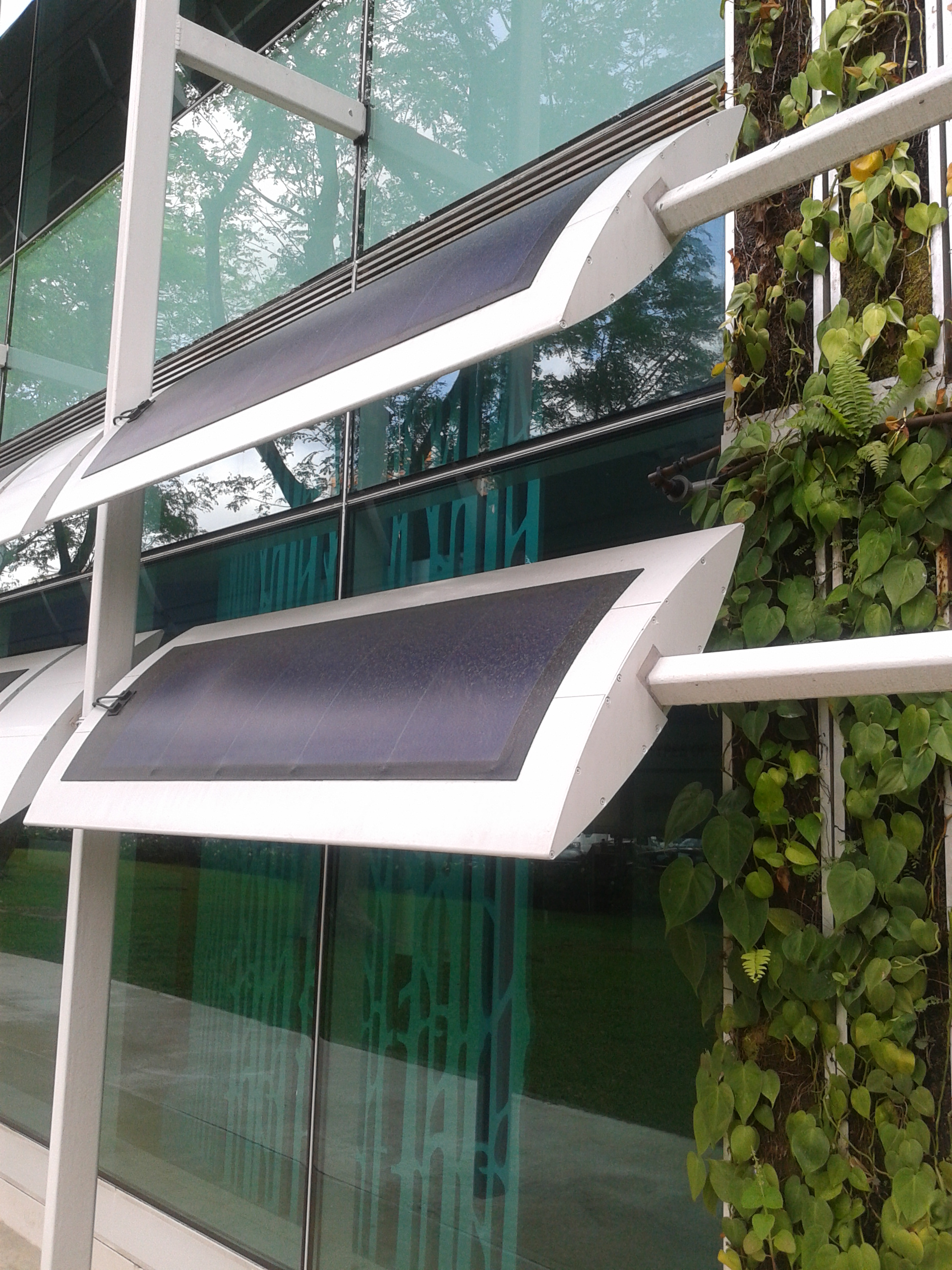
PV panels as external shading device in zero-energy building, Singapore

Solar panels can also be mounted as shade structures where the solar panels can provide shade instead of patio covers. The cost of such shading systems are generally different from standard patio covers, especially in cases where the entire shade required is provided by the panels. The support structure for the shading systems can be normal systems as the weight of a standard PV array is between 3 and 5 pounds/ft^{2}. If the panels are mounted at an angle steeper than normal patio covers, the support structures may require additional strengthening. Other issues that are considered include:

- Simplified array access for maintenance.
- Module wiring may be concealed to maintain the aesthetics of the shading structure.
- Growing vines around the structure must be avoided as they may come in contact with the wiring.

== PV Fencing ==
Bifacial PV modules can be installed vertically and operated as a fence. For example, bifacial PV worked as an outer fence of the global loop in the EXPO 2005 Aichi, Japan. PV systems can also be used for snow fences. Monofacial PV can be metal zip-tied to existing fencing to make a very low cost PV rack. A study cataloged the types of fences and wind load calculations to determine the viability of fence-based racking throughout the U.S. and found fences could have at least one PV module between uprights for agricultural fences (sheep, goats, pigs, cows, and alpaca). For fences microinverters had better performance when the cross-over fence length is under 30 m or when the system was designed with less than seven solar PV modules (e.g. gardens), whereas string inverters were a better selection for longer fences (e.g. farms).

== Sound barriers ==
PV can also be mounted on or be part of sound barriers/ noise barriers. PV on noise barriers and has been around for since 1989 in Switzerland. There has been considerable not only on the PV module technology, but also in the construction of photovoltaic noise barriers (PVNB). The installed capacity of PVNBs deployed on noise barriers in a single state is comparable to the installed capacities of the largest solar farms in the U.S. and yet due to the unique mounting of PVNB, such systems provide better land utilization ratios for energy production than conventional solar PV farms. Because of reduced racking costs PVNB is one of the cheapest ways to implement large scale grid-connected PV installations. There is now ample evidence that a wide range of PVNB systems work.

== See also ==
- Building-integrated photovoltaics
- Solar tracker
- MPPT
- Rooftop photovoltaic power station
- Grid-connected photovoltaic power system
