= Solar canal =

Renewable energy source and waterway

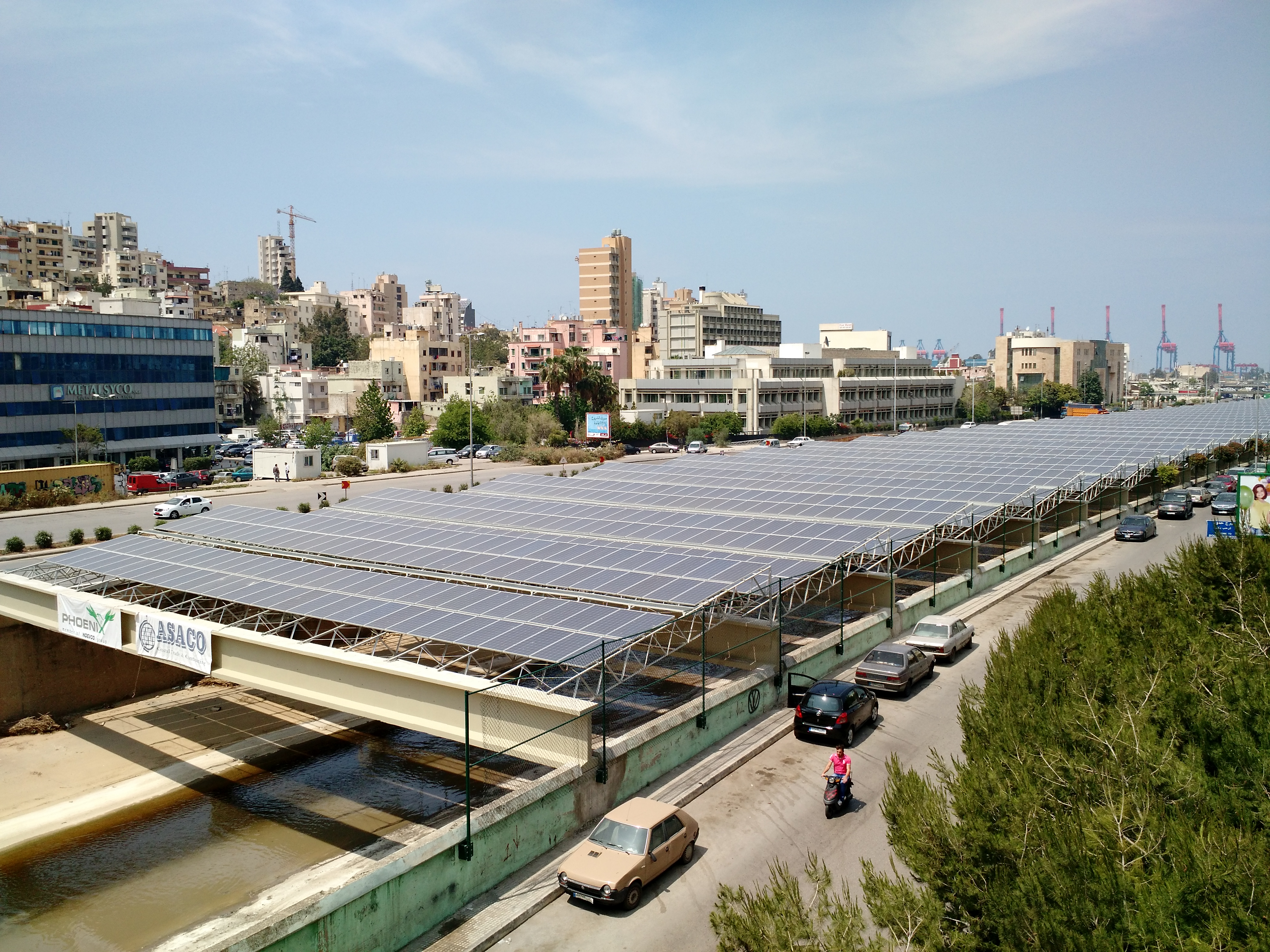
A solar canal in Beirut, Lebanon

A solar canal is a canal fitted with solar panels, increasing their efficiency, and reducing evaporation and land usage. The first operative system was installed in Gujarat, India in 2014.

== Description ==
By placing solar panels above water, evaporation is lessened. Studies from the Canal Solar Power Project in India, show that the resulting shade helps reduce weeds, as well as de-weeding costs. The photovoltaic panels benefit from evaporative cooling. The panels remain cooler, thus reflecting less light and thereby absorbing more energy. Because solar collectors are often built on arable land or natural ecosystems, solar canals could reduce land lost to energy production, as well as conflicts with farmers and other stakeholders. Land acquisition costs and land-use permitting issues may be circumscribed, if canals are already in operation. Irrigation systems may benefit, given that pumps would be located within easy access of a power source.

Solar canals are more costly to install than land-based solar collectors. They also incur higher maintenance costs. Canals that are quite narrow or quite wide can add to the costs of solar canals.

== History ==
A large project in Gujarat, India was completed in 2014. That project utilizes pre-existing irrigation canals, thereby saving land and water, while generating electricity. The project's success led to the initiation of many other solar canals in India. The state of Gujarat has plans to build 19,000 kilometers of solar canals.

The first phase of a large project in Lebanon called the "Beirut River Solar Snake" began in 2013 and was completed in 2015. The project aimed to create solar power in a city where land costs are prohibitively high.

The state of California is moving ahead with plans to build large scale solar canals. A pilot project in Turlock was planned to be completed in 2025.. With pilot construction finished in early 2026, the UCM project led by Dr. Brandi McKuin reports preliminary results showing up to 70% less evaporative water loss and 85% less weed growth in solar panel shaded sections of canal.

Former Secretary-General of the United Nations Ban Ki-moon visited Gujarat's solar canals and declared that they should be adopted globally.

== Future Infrastructure Plans ==
The use of solar photovoltaic (PV) panels over irrigation or water conveyance canals is a form of infrastructure project known as solar canal systems or solar-over-canal systems. This dual use or application has the goals of increasing the production of renewable electricity, limiting the evaporation of water from water bodies, also to limit excessive algae growth, and to promote land conservation by building solar panels over water canals instead of on land.

This novel means of solar energy generation was introduced first in Gujarat, India, in 2014. Because solar canals are a relatively new technology, their scale and uptake so far in the world are limited; further research into technical viability, cost and co-benefits is currently underway in Gujarat as part of India's perimeter expansion of this project.

But in several parts of the world, different governments are implementing infrastructural changes to enable their regions to tap into the advantages of solar canals. For instance, in the USA, there is a pilot project; The Turlock Irrigation District which is scheduled to finish its Project Nexus (1.6 MW) as a proof of concept to cover the state's 4,000 miles (6,400 km) of canals, funded by the California Solar Canal Initiative, a university-led project that is looking at both water savings and a statewide scaling pathway for energy generating solar canals.

Also in 2024, Arizona's Gila River Indian Community finished the first U.S. solar-canal array and has other projects in progress or under consideration, the most prominent of which is the one focusing on the Gila River for the local Indian Community's needs for irrigation power use. There is also a pilot project in progress in Nepal, funded by the Asian Development Bank. There are a few prototypes or proposals in Europe. Overall, global solar canal infrastructure is at an early stage of development, and will require additional pilots, price reductions and policy help to expand in the future.
