= List of solar car teams =

This is a list of solar car racing teams.

== Australia ==
Team name (Affiliation)	Year started	Number of cars	Current car	Car #
Aurora Vehicle Association	1987	5+	101	101
AU Solar Racing (Adelaide University Solar Racing)	2014	3	Lumen III	09
Lake Tuggeranong College Solar Car Association (Lake Tuggeranong College)	1995	2	ACTEW Spirit of Canberra no longer active	5, 10
Sol Invictus - ANU (Australian National University)	2015	2	MTAA SuperCharge 2	41
Sungroper (Sungroper Solar Car Association)	2001	2+	Sungroper 3	6
Sunshark (University of Queensland)	1996	1	no longer active	
UNSW Solar Racing Team (University of New South Wales)	1995	5	Sunswift eVe	75
Western Sydney Solar Team (Western Sydney University)	2012	4	UNLIMITED 3.0	15
Team Arrow (Team Arrow Racing Association)	2012	2	ArrowSTF	30
MTAA Super Solar Racing (Australian National University)	2015	3	Super Charge 3.0	
TAFE South Australia Solar Vehicle Team (TAFE South Australia)	2000 to 2020	3	Kelly, SolarSpirit, SAV (no longer active)	42

== Belgium ==
Team name (Affiliation)	Year started	Number of cars	Current car	Car #
Innoptus Solar Team (KU Leuven)	2004	11	Infinite Apollo	8

== Brazil ==
Team name (Affiliation)	Year started	Number of cars	Current car	Car #
USP Solar (University of São Paulo)	1997	1	The Banana Enterprise	88

== Canada ==
Team name (Affiliation)	Year started	Number of cars	Current car	Car #
Blue Sky Solar Racing (University of Toronto)	1996	10	Viridian	77
Eclipse solar car team (École de technologie supérieure)	1992	12	Éclipse 12	92
Esteban (École Polytechnique de Montréal)	1998	12	Esteban 12	55
McGill University Solarcar Team - Team iSun (McGill University)	1992	3	iSun	66
McMaster Solar Car Project (McMaster University)	1997	5	Spitfire	116
Midnight Sun (University of Waterloo)	1990	16	Midnight Sun XVI	24
Omega Solar (Durham College and UOIT)	2008	1	Arctic Sun	
Queen's University Solar Vehicle Team (Queen's University at Kingston)	1988	11	Aurum	100
SunStang Solar Car Project (University of Western Ontario)	1991	9	Icarus	96
UBC Solar (University of British Columbia)	2008	3	Brightside	26
University of Calgary Solar Car Team (University of Calgary)	2004	4	Schulich Delta	65
University of Ottawa Solar Race Team (University of Ottawa)	1989	2	RALOS II	125
The Power of One, solar car project (Marcelo da Luz)	1999	1	Xof1	125

== Chile ==
Team name(Affiliation)	Year started	Number of cars	Current car	Car #
Emu Alpha (Adolfo Ibáñez University)	2017	1	Emu Alpha	11
Eolian (University of Chile)	2007	5	Eolian Fénix	
ESUS Solar Team (University of Santiago, Chile)	2011	3	Apolo 3	
Antakari Solar Team (University of La Serena)	2011	3	Intikallpa 3	
Equipo Solar (University of Concepción)	2011	2	Antünekul	

== Colombia ==
Team name (Affiliation)	Year started	Number of cars	Current car	Car #
EAFIT-EPM Solar Car Team (EAFIT University)	2012	2	Primavera	05

== Denmark ==
Team name (Affiliation)	Year started	Number of cars	Current car	Car #
Solvogn Danmark (Sønderborg Teknikum)	1986	3	TheThird (1996)	23

== Estonia ==
Team name (Affiliation)	Year started	Number of cars	Current car	Car #
Solaride (University of Tartu, Tallinn University of Technology, Estonian University of Life Sciences)	2020	3	Solaride III Enefit	66

== France ==
Team name (Affiliation)	Year started	Number of cars	Current car	Car #
Helios	1992	4	Helios IV	4

== Germany ==
Team name (Affiliation)	Year started	Number of cars	Current car	Car #
HS Bochum Solar Car Team (Hochschule Bochum)	1999	6	thyssenkrupp SunRiser	11
Sonnenwagen Aachen (RWTH Aachen University and FH Aachen University of Applied Sciences)	2015	5	Covestro Æthon	7
TUfast Eco Team (Technical University of Munich)	2023	1	lux025	32

== Greece ==
Team name (Affiliation)	Year started	Number of cars	Current car	Website
University of Patras	2005	1	HERMES II (Unfinished)	

== India ==
Team name (Affiliation)	Year started	Number of cars	Current car	Car #
Team AgniRath (Indian Institute of Technology Madras)	2021	2	Aagneya	28
Electro-X India (Galgotias University)	2017	1	V1	
DJS Helios (Dwarkadas J. Sanghvi College of Engineering)	2015	3	TBA	
Solaris D.T.U Solar Car (D.T.U {DCE})	2006	4	Arka	SOLARIS007
NSIT Solar Car (NSIT)	2007	4	Phoenix 1	99
SolarMobil Manipal - (Manipal Institute of Technology Solar Car) (Manipal Institute of Technology)	2011	4	SM-S2 (5th Car in progress)	
RVCE Solar Car Team (R.V. College of Engineering)	2013	2	Arka	34
Team Hyperion (Sinhgad College of Engineering)	2016	2	INFINITI 4.0	3
Team Saurveg (Finolex Academy of Management and Technology Ratnagiri Maharashtra)	2016	3	SOLEX	
Team Solarium (Pimpri Chinchwad College of Engineering)	2016	8	Invictus 6.0	

== Iran ==
Team name (Affiliation)	Year started	Number of cars	Current car	Car #
Persian Gazelle Solar Car Team (University of Tehran)	2004	4	Persian Gazelle IV	38
Havin Solar Car Team (Qazvin Islamic Azad University)	2009	2	HAVIN 2	73

== Italy ==
Team name (Affiliation)	Year started	Number of cars	Current car	Car #
Onda solare (University of Bologna)	2003	4	Emilia 4	9
Futuro Solare (Futuro Solare Association)	2006	2	Archimede1.1	7

== Jordan ==
Team name (Affiliation)	Year started	Number of cars	Current car	Car #
Philadelphia University	2013	1	Ben Ben	1

== Japan ==
Team name (Affiliation)	Year started	Number of cars	Current car	Car #
Akita University				
Ashiya University Solar Car Project	1992	3	Ashiya SkyAceTIGA	
Honda	1990	3	Honda Dream	3
Junk Yard	1998	1	Spirit of Junkyard	16
Kyocera and Kitami Institute of Technology	1987		Son of Sun	77
Mitsubishi Materials	1996	1	Sun Challenger	33
Nagoya Institute of Technology	1992			
Tokai University	1991	9	Tokai Challenger; Tokai Spirit; Tokai Falcon	60; 11; 3
Toyota	1989	?	Toyota RaRa X	8
Osaka Institute of Technology			Iris Type ONE	
Osaka Sangyo University			OSU Model S	
Kanazawa Institute of Technology	1999	4	KIT Golden Eagle4	
Team Shimon				
Hama Zero				
TEAM SUNLAKE	1993	12	SUNLAKE EVO	
Hoxan				
Team Jona Sun	1994	6	RAZARTE Jona Sun	9
Ritsumeikan University			Vi-mana09	
Tottori University				
Waseda University	1990		Sky Blue Waseda	
Yamaguchi University				
Zero to Darwin Project	1991	3		151
Team OKINAWA	2009	3	LEQUION	90
Kogakuin University	2009	3	OWL	

== Korea, Republic of ==
Team name (Affiliation)	Year started	Number of cars	Current car	Car #
Seoul National University Solar EV (Seoul National University)	2025	1	SNUONE	82

== Indonesia ==
Team name (Affiliation)	Year started	Number of cars	Current car	Car #
ITS Solar Car Racing Team (Institut Teknologi Sepuluh Nopember Surabaya)	1985	4	Sapu Angin Surya	32

== Malaysia ==
Team name (Affiliation)	Year started	Number of cars	Current car	Car #
UTM Solar Car Team (Universiti Teknologi Malaysia)	1995	2	Suriakar 2	9

== Morocco ==
Team name (Affiliation)	Year started	Number of cars	Current car	Car #
Mines Rabat Solar Team (École Nationale Supérieure des Mines de Rabat)	2013	4	Eleadora 2	2

== The Netherlands ==
Team name (Affiliation)	Year started	Number of cars	Current car	Car #
Nuon Solar Team (Delft University of Technology)	2001	13	Nuna 13	3
Solar Team Twente (University of Twente)	2004	11	Red XI	21
Solar Team Eindhoven (Eindhoven University of Technology)	2012	6	Stella Terra	40
Top Dutch Solar Racing (Hanzehogeschool Groningen and University of Groningen)	2017	4	Green Falcon	6

== Pakistan ==
Team name (Affiliation)	Year started	Number of cars	Current car	Car #
Solar Samba (NED University, Karachi)	1987	1	'pakistani 12	67

== Poland ==
Team name (Affiliation)	Year started	Number of cars	Current car	Car #
AGH Eko-Energia (AGH University of Science and Technology)	2022	0	Perła	1
Lodz Solar Team (Lodz University of Technology)	2014	2	Eagle 2	45
PUT Solar Dynamics (Poznań University of Technology)	2018	1	Klara	777

== Puerto Rico ==
Team name (Affiliation)	Year started	Number of cars	Current car	Car #
Solar Engineering Research Racing Team (University of Puerto Rico at Mayagüez)	1989	4	El Wanabi	787

== Saudi Arabia ==
Team name (Affiliation)	Year started	Number of cars	Current car	Car #
Seraaj Team (King Fahd University of Petroleum and Minerals)	2011	2	Wahj1 & Wahj2	63

== South Africa ==
Team name (Affiliation)	Year started	Number of cars	Current car	Car #
UJ Solar (University of Johannesburg)	2011	2	Ilanga I.I	7
Wits Solar Car (University of the Witwatersrand)	2010	2	Parhelion	3
Sunna (Divwatt)	2008	1	Sunna	15
Advanced Energy Foundation (Non-profit Group)	2008	1	Sanyo Iritron	12
Deutsche Schule Johannesburg (German Intl high school)	2009	1	tba	1
NWU Solar Team (North-West University)	2012	5	Naledi 2.0	23
UKZN Solar Team (University of KwaZulu-Natal)	2012	2	iKlwa	31
TUT Solar Car Team (Tshwane University of Technology)	2012	4	Sunchaser 4	4
Sonke (St. Alban's College and St. Augustine's LEAP School)	2018	1	Siyakude	24
CUT Solar Racing Team (Central University of Technology)	2018	2	Seilatsatsi	22
Genuine JV (HTS John Vorster)	2022	1	Voltwagen	60
Team UFS (University of the Free State)	2022	1	Lengau	99

== Sweden ==
Team name (Affiliation)	Year started	Number of cars	Current car	Car #
JU Solar Team (Jönköping University)	2013	6	Nova Lumina	46
Chalmers Solar Team (Chalmers University of Technology)	2019	4	Arvaker	51
Halmstad University Solar Team (Halmstad University, Sweden)	2019	3	Henry	23
MDH Solar Team (Mälardalen University College)	2017	2	Viking	22

== Switzerland ==
Team name (Affiliation)	Year started	Number of cars	Current car	Car #
Spirit of Biel (Ecole d'Ingénieurs de Bienne)	1987	4		
Heliox Solar Team (Dominic de Vries)	2007	1		
SWISSPIRIT	2009	1	SWISSPIRIT	71
ACE Solar Racing (ETH Zurich)	2022	2	Silvretta	85

== Thailand ==
Team name (Affiliation)	Year started	Number of cars	Current car	Car #
STC Solar Motor Team	2015	5	STC-4	49

== Turkey ==
Team name (Affiliation)	Year started	Number of cars	Current car	Car #
TurkMekatronik Solar Car Team (Kocaeli University)	2000	7	GAYRET	
Anadolu Solar Team (Anadolu University)	2006	4	Sunatolia 2	26
ORET (Gaziantep University)	2005	4	ORETRON-2	27
ATILIM SOLLAR (Atılım University)	2003	2	HASAT, MELIH TURGUT	
OSCAR Solar Car Team (Eskişehir Osmangazi University)	2009	2	OSCAR/9	009
METU Robot Society (Middle East Technical University)	2003	3	ODTU-TEK	
SAITEM-Sakarya University Advanced Technologies Application Community (Sakarya University)	2003	5	SAGUAR II	6
Boğaziçi University Solar Car Team (Boğaziçi University)	2006	2	Theia	59R
EGETET (Ege University)	2006	1	EgEFE, EgEFE+, EgEFE jr.	
H.Ü. Formula G Team (Hacettepe University)	2007	2	Hünkar, Hünkar-D	#23, Unknown
SOCRAT (Istanbul University)	2008	5	SOCRAT'12	1
ITU Solar Car Team (Istanbul Technical University)	2003	9	B.O.W.	34
EcoMagnesia Solar Car Team (Celal Bayar University)	2007	4	Bayaraba, Magar, Tarzan I, Tarzan II	
METU SoularCAR TEAM (Middle East Technical University)	2003	2	SoularCar 1&2	
SOLAMAR (Marmara University)	2006	1	Marti	
Solar Team Solaris (Dokuz Eylül University)	2003	12	S11	81
Yenerji (Middle East Technical University)	2006	1	Myst	
YTU Ae2 Project (Yıldız Technical University)	2010	2	Ae2 Solar	418 (SEM)
YTU AESK (Yıldız Technical University)	2004	7	Barracuda X	
Hitit Gunesi Solar Car Team (Ankara University)	2003	2	Günebakan	
YASARGUNES1; Yasar University	2009	2	YASAR GUNES-1, YASAR GUNES-2	

== United Arab Emirates ==
Team name (Affiliation)	Year started	Number of cars	Current car	Car #
PI Solar Car Team (The Petroleum Institute)	2014	1	YAS	1

== United Kingdom ==
Team name (Affiliation)	Year started	Number of cars	Current car	Car #
Durham University Solar Car (Durham University)	2002	4	DUSC2023	20
Cambridge University Eco Racing (University of Cambridge)	2007	5	Mirage	
UCL SolarFox (University College London)	2007	1	SolarFox3	
Edinsolar (University of Edinburgh)	2014	1	TBA	1

== United States ==
Team name (Affiliation)	Year started	Number of cars	Current car	Car #
App State Team Sunergy (Appalachian State University)	2013	3	Autumn	828
Arizona Solar Racing Team (University of Arizona)	1997	5	Drifter 2.0	8
Arizona State University Solar Vehicle Team (Arizona State University)	1990	2	Sun Devil Cruiser	
Belmont Solar Car Team (Belmont High School)	2011	1		
Bloomington High School South Solar Racing (Bloomington High School South)	1997	5	Komachi	
CalSol - UC Berkeley Solar Vehicle Team (University of California, Berkeley)	1991	9	Tachyon	6
Cal State LA Solar Car Team (California State University, Los Angeles)	1990	3	Solar Eagle III	8
Coppell Solar Car (Coppell High School)	2001	8	Solstice	20
Georgia Southern University Solar Vehicle Team (Georgia Southern University)	2007	1		
Georgia Tech Solar Racing (Georgia Institute of Technology)	2001	3	Endurance	49
Hypernova Solar (George Mason University)	2018	1	Orion	77
Illini Solar Car (University of Illinois at Urbana–Champaign)	2014	3	Calypso	22
Illinois State University Solar Race Team (Illinois State University)	2004	6	Mercury 6	17
KSU Solar Racing Team (Kansas State University)	1995	5	ReParagon (2008)	28
KSU Solar Vehicle Team (Kennesaw State University)	2016			
LATI Solar Car Team; Lake Area Technical Institute	2012	1	Tombstone	
Los Altos Solar Vehicle Team; Los Altos High School	2001		Solar Shadow III	
Michigan State University (Michigan State University)	2010	2	Leonidas	13
Missouri S&T Solar Car Team (Missouri University of Science and Technology)	1991	12	Independence	42
MIT Solar Electric Vehicle Team (Massachusetts Institute of Technology)	1985	15	Nimbus	4
Mizzou Solar Car Team (University of Missouri)	1992	6	SunTiger VI	43
Montana State University (Montana State University)	1995	2	Double Black Diamond	406
Newburgh Free Academy Solar Racing Team (NFA Solar Racing Team)	2007		Sol Machine VII	
New Jersey Institute of Technology Solar Car Team (New Jersey Institute of Technology)	2017	1	Eleos	86
NUsolar (Northwestern University)	1999	6	sc6	11
Ohio State Solar Vehicle Team (Ohio State University)	1993 (Note: The OSU solar team was formed shortly after the beginning of the 1993-1994 school year in September, 1993; they first competed in Sunrayce 95)	1	Firefly	
Oregon Solar Car Team (Bend-LaPine School District)	2007	3	Lumidos	
Oregon State University Solar Vehicle Team (Oregon State University)	2005	3	Phoenix	256
Prairie View A&M University Solar Car Team (Prairie View A&M University)	1995	1		
Principia Solar Car Team (Principia College)	1991	11	Ra XI	32
Project SARA (Project SARA)	2007	1	SARA I	1
PrISUm (Iowa State University)	1989	14	Eliana	9
Purdue Solar Racing (Purdue University)	1991	10	Lux	1
Rice Solar Car Team (Rice University)	2010	1	Enterprise	103
Rose-Hulman Solar Phantom (Rose-Hulman Institute of Technology)	1990	6	Solar Phantom VI	74
RPI Solar Car Racing Team (Rensselaer Polytechnic Institute)	2008	2	'Photon'	
Rutgers Solar Car Team (Rutgers University)	2009	1	Solar Jeffreys	1
SIUE Solar Car Racing Team (Southern Illinois University Edwardsville)	2004	4	Nova	57
SOL of Auburn (Auburn University)	1989	6	"TIGER"	7
Solar Racing Team at TTU (Texas Tech University)	2009	1	Raider 1	23
SolarPack (North Carolina State University)	2017	1		99
SPHS Solar Knights (South Plantation High School)	2005	3	The Solar Knight III	
Stanford solar car project (Stanford University)	1989	15	Azimuth	16
Sunseeker (Western Michigan University)	1990	9	Aethon	786
Sunsetters NDSU Solar Race Team (North Dakota State University)	2001	2	Prairie Fire GT	22
Team New England (MIT) (no longer affiliated) (UMASS Lowell) (no longer affiliated) (Northern Essex Community College) (historic affiliation)	1993	5		28
Texas A&M Solar Racing Team (Texas A&M University)	1993	5		12
Triton Solar Car (University of California, San Diego)	2015			
West Point (United States Military Academy)	1995	1	Onondaga	27
University of Florida Solar Gators (University of Florida)	2014	3	Sunrider	5
University of Kentucky Solar Car Team (University of Kentucky)	1999	6	Gato del Sol VI	3
University of Michigan Solar Car Team (University of Michigan)	1989	17	Astrum	2
University of Minnesota Solar Vehicle Project (University of Minnesota)	1990	14	Freya	35
University of Texas Solar Vehicle Team (University of Texas at Austin)	1988	9	Lonestar	
University of Toledo Solar Car Team (University of Toledo)	2010	1		
University of Utah Solar Vehicle Design Team; University of Utah	2001	1	Steel Sun Beast	
UVA Solar Car Team (University of Virginia)	1998	3	Solar Revolution III	87
University of Wisconsin-Madison Badger Solar Racing (University of Wisconsin-Madison)	2021	1	Helios	608
Viking XX Team (Western Washington University)	1990	1		20
Virginia Tech Solar Car Team (Virginia Tech)	1990	5	Sun Gobbler	21
Winston Solar Car Team (The Winston School)	1990	9	The Hunter	
ZotSun - UC Irvine Solar Car Team (University of California, Irvine)	2016	1	SolEater	95

== Venezuela ==
Team name (Affiliation)	Year started	Number of cars	Current car	Car #
USB Solar (Universidad Simón Bolívar)	2005	2	KÄI CS2	8

== New Zealand ==
Team name (Affiliation)	Year started	Number of cars	Current car	Car #
Solar Fern (Solar Fern Racing)	2006	1	Solar Fern	35

== See also ==
- World Solar Challenge
- North American Solar Challenge
