= Hermann Josef Buchkremer =

German physicist

Hermann Josef Buchkremer (11 May 1940) is a German physicist and former Rector of the FH Aachen University of Applied Sciences.

== Life and work ==
After completing his studies, Buchkremer studied physics at the University of Cologne and the RWTH Aachen. After receiving his Diplom, he worked as a research associate at the Highway Research Institute of the RWTH Aachen, then at the Institute for Reactor Safety at the Jülich Research Centre.

After the founding of the FH Aachen University of Applied Sciences with Jülich Campus, Buchkremer started as a lecturer in physical engineering, neutron physics and atomic physics and was appointed professor several years later. Starting in 1974 he taught the general education subjects. In 1968, he was elected Speaker for the Campus Jülich. In 1991, he was elected Rector of the FH Aachen University of Applied Sciences, where he remained until his retirement in 2005.

Buchkremer was appointed Honorary Senator of the FH Aachen University of Applied Sciences in 2010 for his contributions to the university.
