= Sonnenwagen Aachen =

German solar car development project

(Germany) Sonnenwagen Aachen
- Founded: 21 September 2015
- Base: Aachen, Germany
- Current series: World Solar Challenge 2019
- Former series: World Solar Challenge 2017
- Website: https://www.sonnenwagen.org/

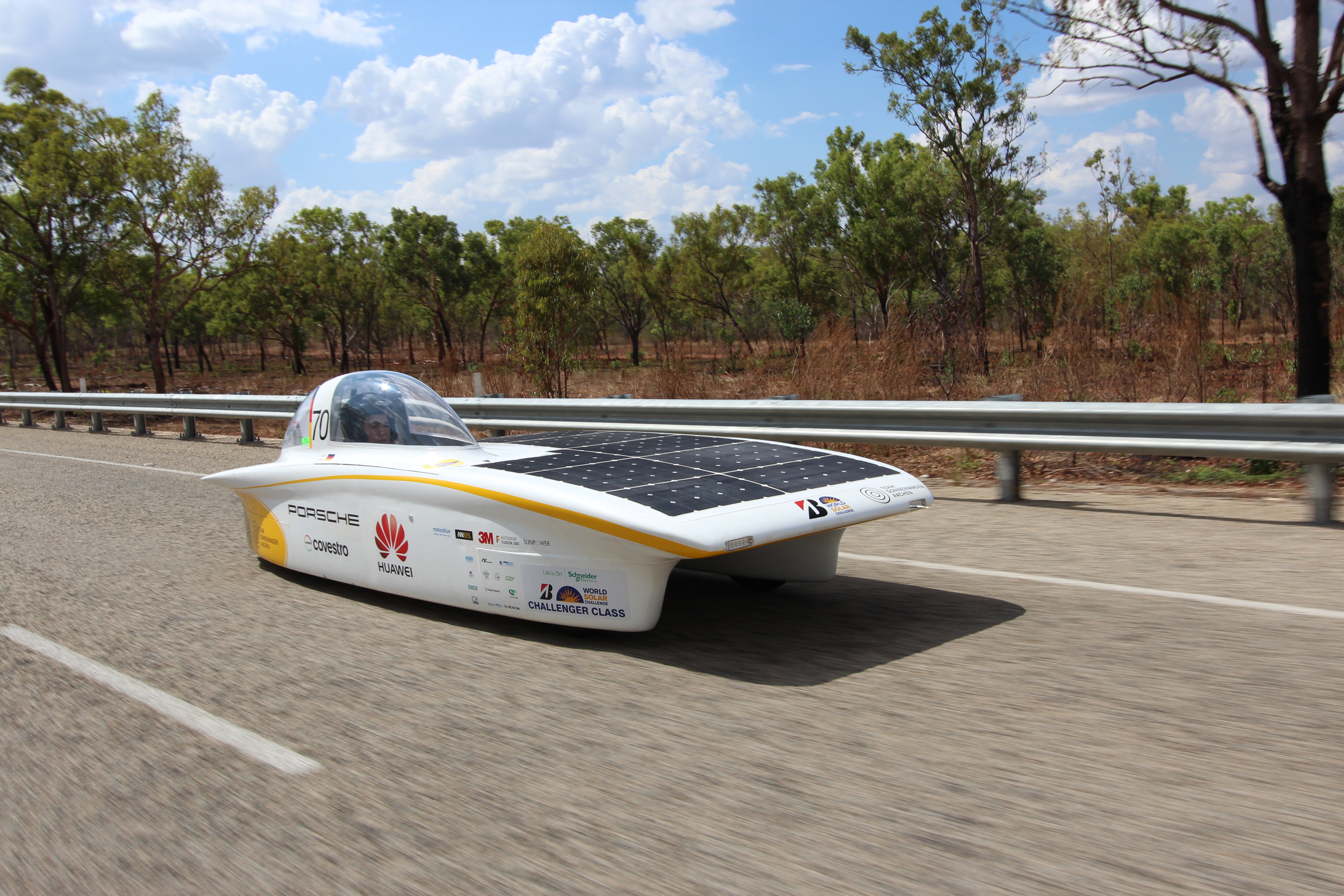
Huawei Sonnenwagen on Stuart Highway during the World Solar Challenge 2017

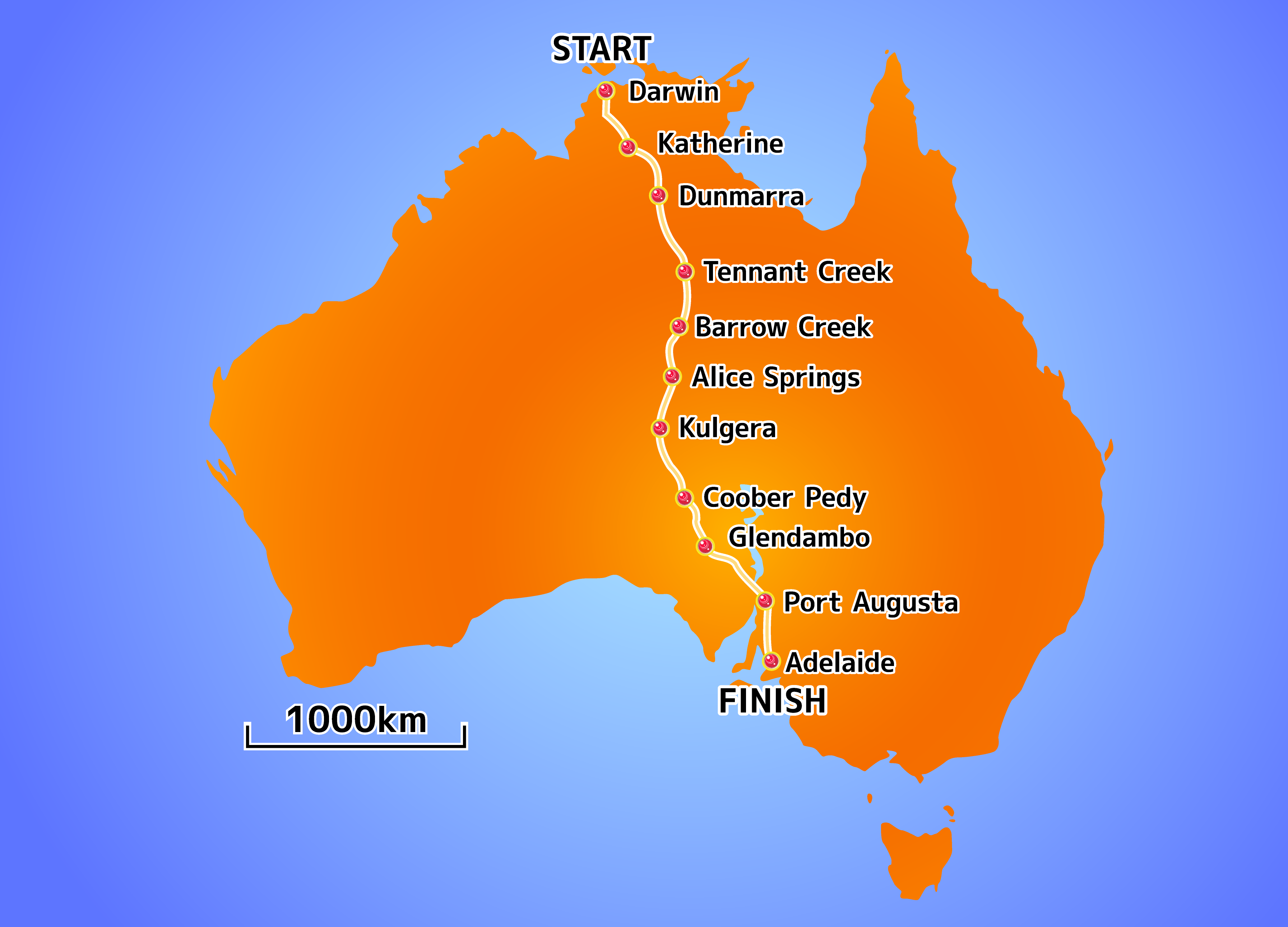
Route for the World Solar Challenge 2017 in Australia

Sonnenwagen Aachen is a current project by students from RWTH Aachen University and FH Aachen for the development and construction of a solar car, to participate in the World Solar Challenge in Australia. The solar car race with a length of 3022 km from Darwin in Northern Territory to Adelaide in South Australia is known to be the longest solar car race in the world and has celebrated its 30th anniversary in October 2017.

The project currently has about 40 active members from different backgrounds (mechanical engineering, electric engineering, business administration, among others) that work on the solar car in their free time. Sponsors provide financial, educational, software and hardware support to Sonnenwagen Aachen.

== Background ==
The World Solar Challenge (or Bridgestone World Solar Challenge since 2013 due to the sponsorship of Bridgestone Corporation) is a biennial solar-powered car race which covers 3,022 km (1,878 mi) through the Australian Outback, from Darwin, Northern Territory to Adelaide, South Australia.

Sonnenwagen Aachen was founded with the goal of developing a solar car to participate in the Challenger class. In this class, the most efficient and enduring car wins, recharging of the internal batteries is not allowed and cars are heavily optimized for aerodynamics, light-weight design and efficient power usage. The team aims to promote electric mobility, sustainable transport and to raise awareness of alternative propulsion concepts. The project also allows its participants to gain first-hand experience in developing and constructing a highly efficient power train.

== Team Sonnenwagen Aachen ==
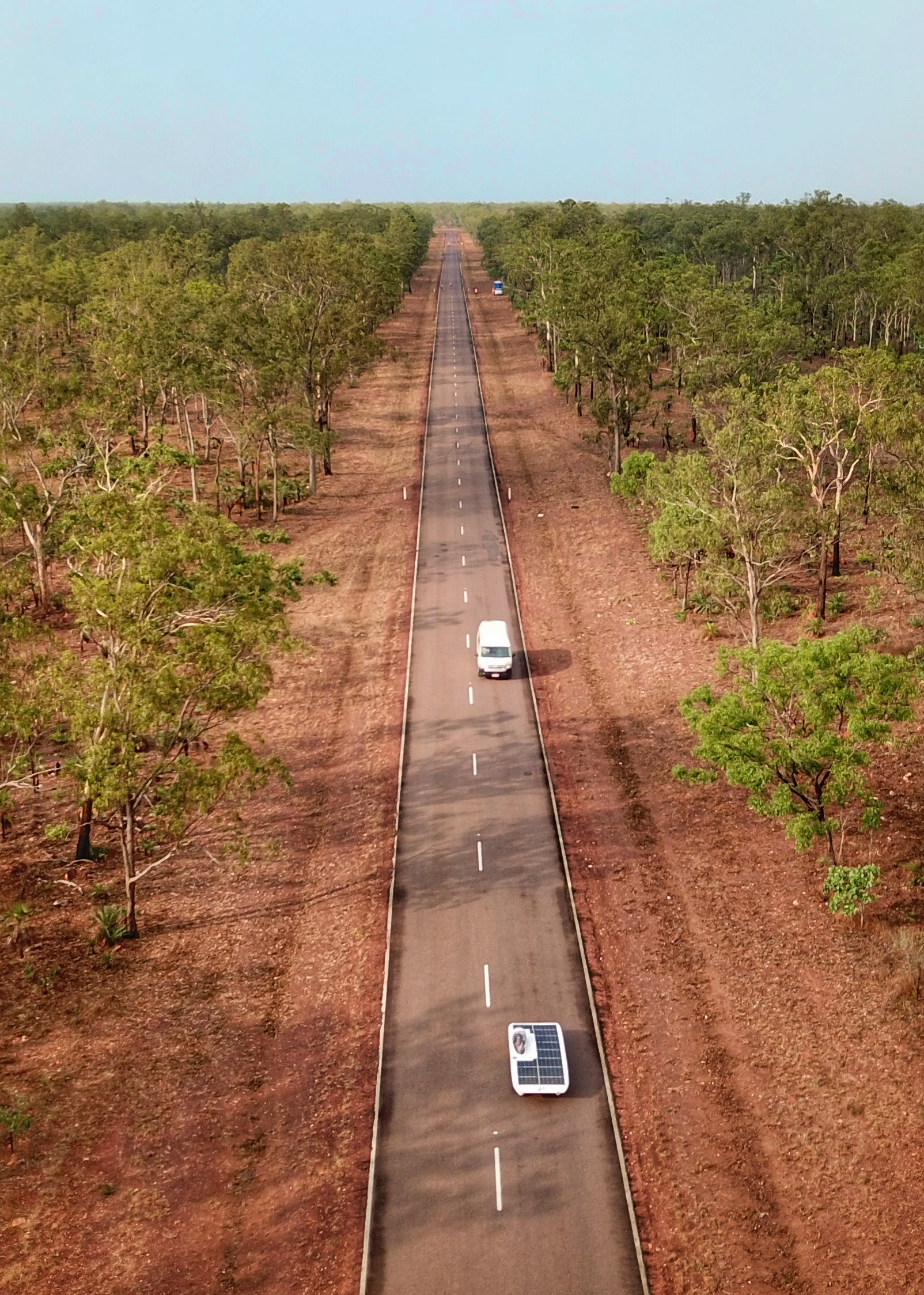
Test drive of the Huawei Sonnenwagen on Cox Peninsula

Team Sonnenwagen Aachen develops and manufactures the Sonnenwagen Aachen solar cars and participated in the Bridgestone World Solar Challenge 2017 for the first time. As of October 2017, 45 students from Aachen were actively contributing to the project. The team is structured into the following departments:

- Management
- Non-technical
  - Sponsoring
  - Marketing
  - Logistics
  - Project management
  - IT
- Mechanics
  - Chassis
  - Structure
- Electrical engineering
  - Battery
  - Solar panel
  - Motor
  - Onboard electronics
- Aerodynamics
  - Simulation
  - Wind tunnel
- Driving strategy

== Solar cars ==
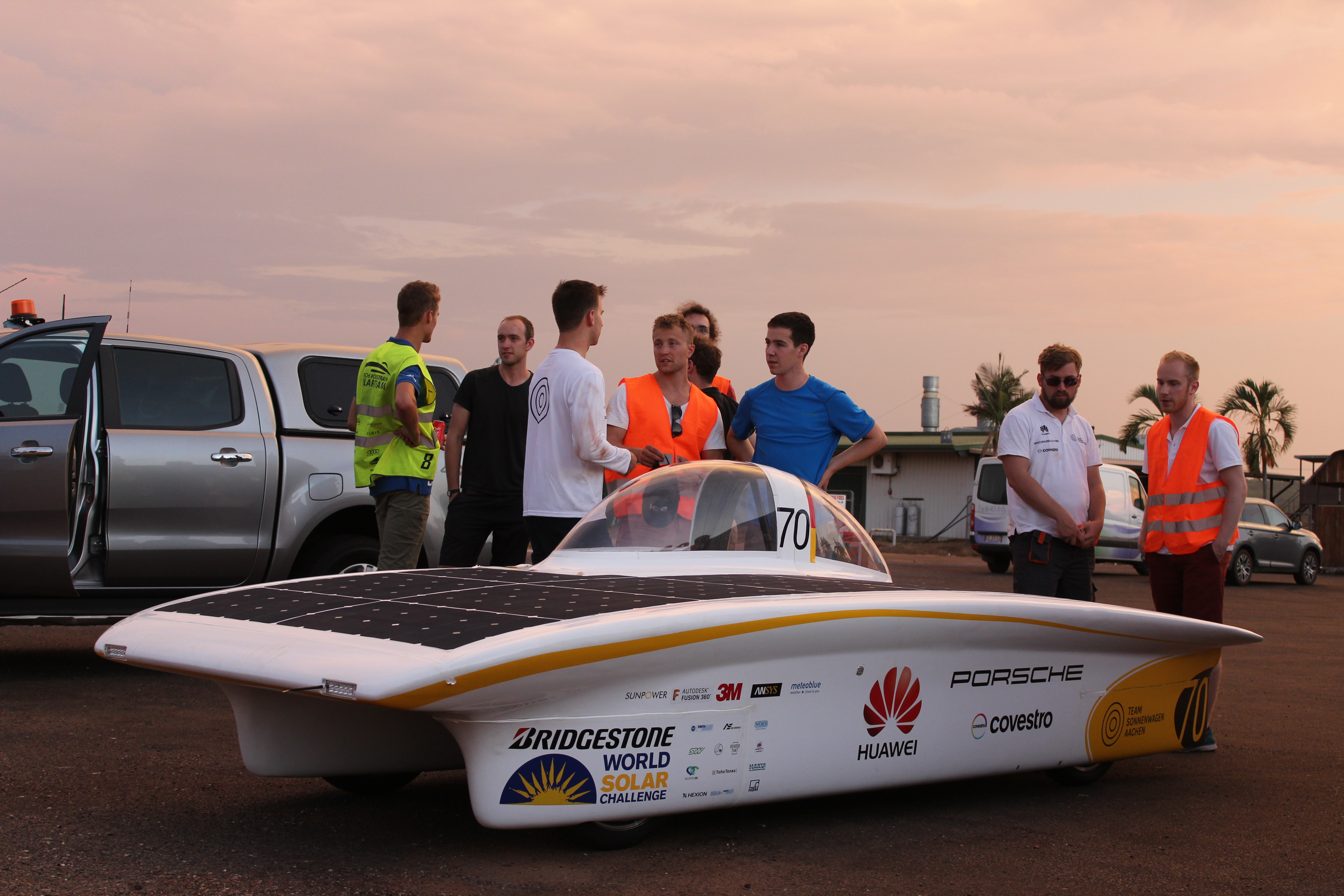
Huawei Sonnenwagen after a test run in Australia

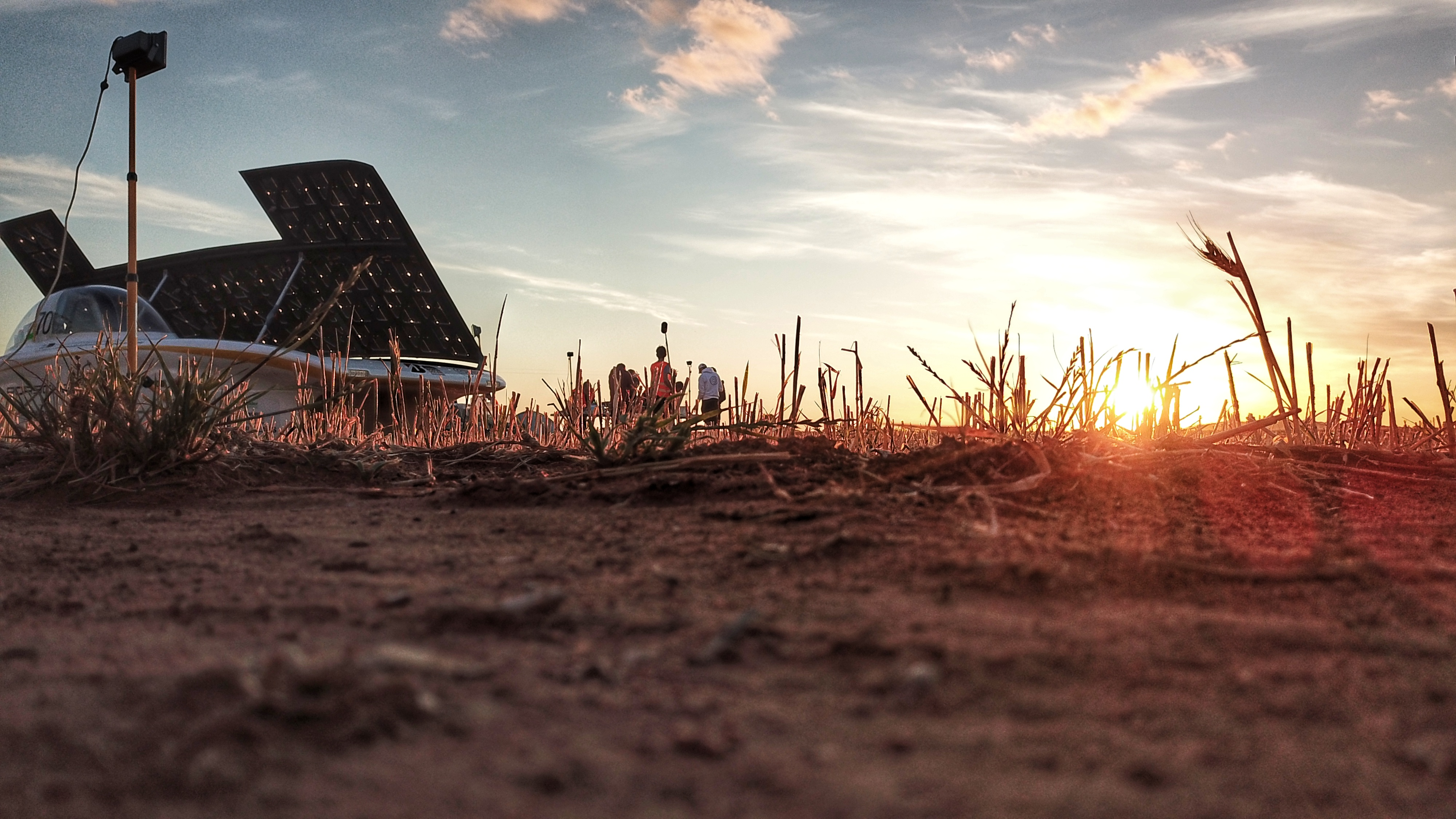
Huawei Sonnenwagen with inclined solar array for better energy capture during sunset

=== Huawei Sonnenwagen (2017) ===
The first solar car Huawei Sonnenwagen is named after the 2017 main sponsor, Huawei, and was specifically designed to comply with and perform well in the Challenger-class of the Bridgestone World Solar Challenge 2017. The overall design resembles a catamaran with two ship-like bodies encasing the four wheels, and a large, horizontal wing in between carrying the solar cells. This design minimizes frontal area to reduce aerodynamic drag while maximizing exposure of the solar cells to solar irradiation. The driver sits between the wheels on the right side under a curved cockpit glass and is protected by race-grade seat belts and a strong roll bar.

With a carbon fiber outer hull, the car weighs less than 200 kg. 4 m^{2} (43 sq ft) of high-efficiency silicon solar cells are powering the car and charging the buffer battery, employing maximum power point trackers (MPPTs) to maximize energy yield. A single custom-built electric motor propels the car to cruising speeds of approx. 70 km/h (43 mph), with a top speed of more than 130 km/h (81 mph).

The car entered the World Solar Challenge 2017 with start number 70.

=== Covestro Sonnenwagen (2019) ===
The second solar car Covestro Sonnenwagen, built for participation in the Challenger-class of World Solar Challenge 2019, features improvements over the first generation vehicle: Weight and aerodynamic drag are significantly reduced, a new battery and motor are developed. Covestro, a chemical company specialized in polymers and main sponsor of the 2019 vehicle, supplied the team with innovative materials such as heat-resistant bio-coatings and an energy-absorbing passenger box for crash-safety. 3D printing is used to manufacture customized, light-weight parts. 890 solar cells, wired in a special way that minimizes energy losses due to shadowing by the cockpit, provide a peak power of 1000 Watts for propulsion and charging of the internal battery. Due to the high efficiency and low resistance of the car, the battery with a capacity of only 5kWh makes an all-electric range of up to 500km at 90km/h possible.

== Partners ==
=== World Solar Challenge 2017 ===
Main sponsor was the Chinese networking and telecommunications company Huawei with headquarter in Shenzhen and European head office in Düsseldorf. Gold sponsors were the German material producer Covestro from Leverkusen, a spin-off of Bayer AG, and German high-performance car manufacturer Porsche AG from Stuttgart-Zuffenhausen.

The sponsors provided financial, technological and hardware backing to Sonnenwagen Aachen. Telecommunications equipment for remote Internet access via satellite was supplied by Huawei. Covestro provided a special polyurethane paint that uses a bio-based hardener and is suited for the harsh conditions in the Australian outback.

=== World Solar Challenge 2019 ===
Main sponsor is German chemical company Covestro and gold sponsors are both Aachen universities RWTH Aachen University and FH Aachen University of Applied Sciences. Further notable supporters and partners are software company Autodesk, Total S.A., BayWa r.e. (the renewable energy sector of BayWa) and logistics company DHL.

== Results ==
=== World Solar Challenge ===
==== 2017 ====
With a 5th place in qualifying (dynamic scrutineering), Team Sonnenwagen reached the finish line in Adelaide on October 14 at 10:50:48. Overall results and place in the Challenger class are still to be announced.

=== European Solar Challenge ===
The European Solar Challenge is a biennial 24-hour solar car race at the Circuit Zolder in Belgium that attracts solar teams from Europe and all over the world.

==== 2018 ====
Team Sonnenwagen participated in the iLumen European Solar Challenge 2018 with its Huawei Sonnenwagen solar car and was awarded third place in the overall ranking in Challenger class. Due to adverse weather conditions, the race was challenging for all participants and not only demanded an efficient solar car, but also skilled drivers, high driving stability and a waterproof car.

== Media coverage ==
Being the first German team in Challenger class, Team Sonnenwagen Aachen received broad coverage in various online and offline media. Popular online media such as German national news Wirtschaftswoche, n-tv, Welt and Spiegel Online, one of the most-read German news websites, broadly covered the development of the car and the race in Australia. Printed media include local newspaper Aachener Nachrichten.

=== Television ===
A 5-minute documentary about the participation in the World Solar Challenge 2017, including driver interviews and manufacturing footage, aired on December 1, 2017, on n-tv Startup News. The recording can be viewed in the n-TV Mediathek.

TV channel West German Broadcasting Cologne (WDR) broadcast a report about the unveiling event in Berlin on 20 July 2017 with main sponsor Huawei and Federal Minister for the Environment, Barbara Hendricks.

9 News Darwin aired a short interview with team leader Hendrik Loebberding on 28 September 2017, during a test run near Darwin.

The participation in the World Solar Challenge 2023 and the development of the solar-powered vehicle Covestro Adelie were documented in the film Sonnenwagen – Future Mobility. The documentary provides insights into the technical and logistical challenges of the project and follows the experiences of the student team during their preparation for and participation in the 2023 race. It also addresses aspects of team dynamics and reflects on the future of sustainable mobility.

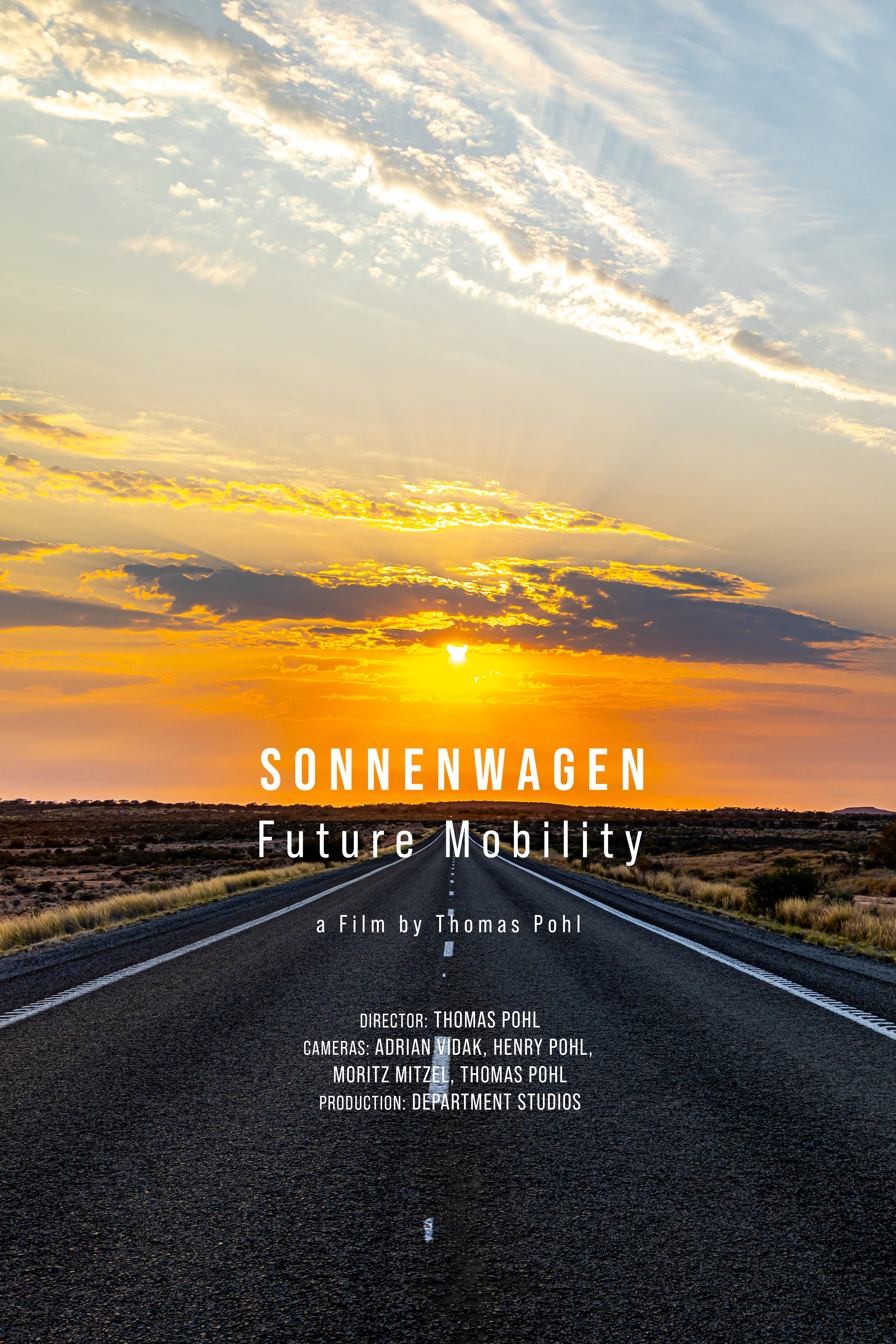
Documentary Sonnenwagen - Future Mobility by Thomas Pohl

In 2025, the film received the first prize in the Documentary category at the New York TriState International Film Festival and was nominated for the Camgaroo Award 2025 and the Berlin Lift-Off Film Festival 2025. The film was directed by Thomas Pohl.

== See also ==
- List of solar car teams
- Solar car racing
- Nuna - competing Dutch solar cars from Delft
- Twente One - competing Dutch solar cars from Enschede
- Stella - Dutch solar car series in Cruiser class
- PowerCore SunCruiser - Cruiser class vehicle from Bochum University of Applied Sciences
