= RVCE Solar Car Team =

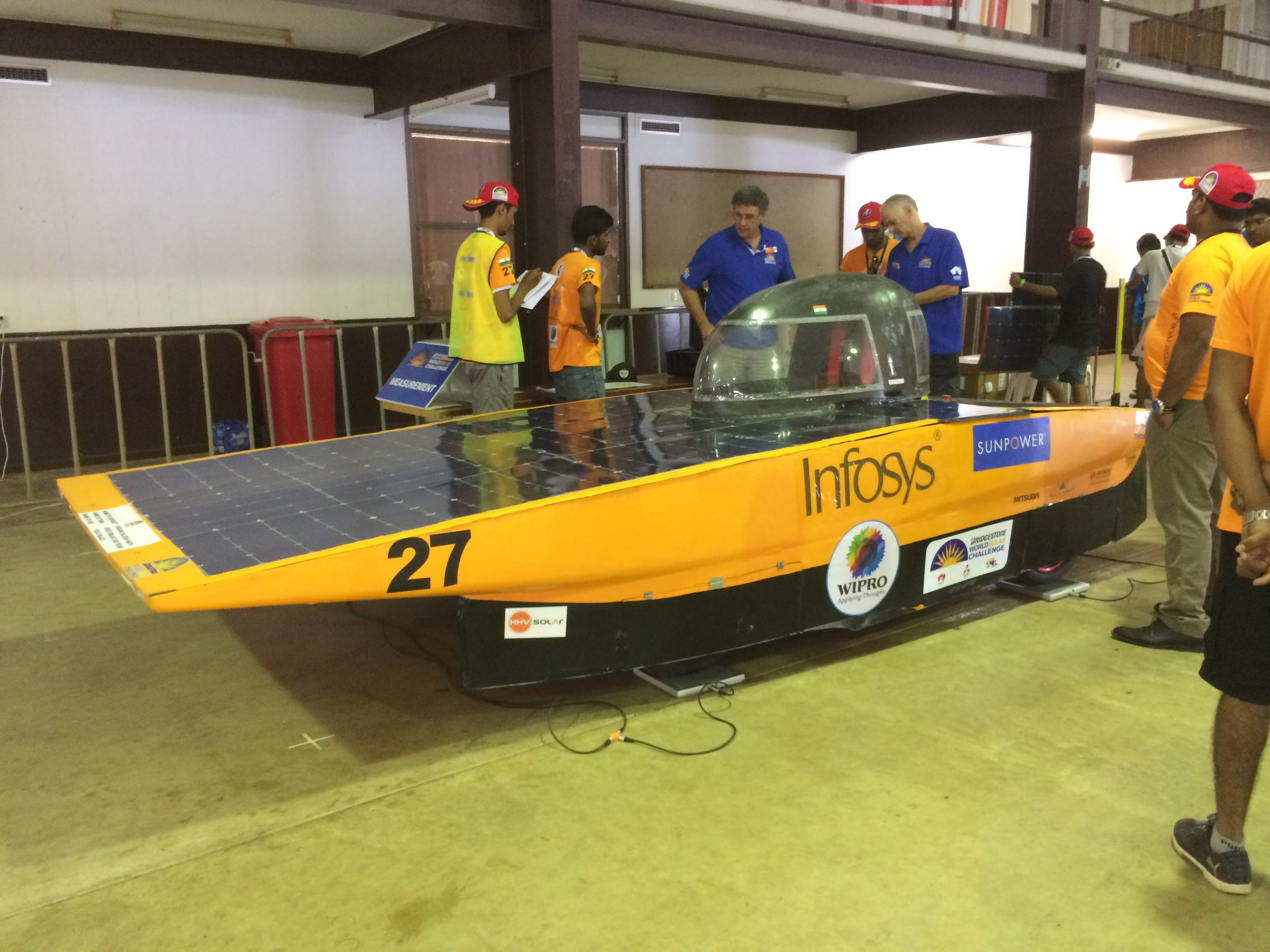
The RVCE Solar Car Team's first prototype - The Soleblaze

The RVCE Solar Car Team, Bangalore, India is an entirely student-run group that designs and builds solar electric vehicles. The team currently consists of 40 students from R.V. College of Engineering (RVCE) pursuing their bachelor of engineering in various fields: aerospace engineering, mechanical engineering, electronics and communication, electrical engineering, computer science, chemical engineering and industrial engineering and management. The team was established in 2013, with an objective to primarily help promote the use of solar technology, as well as inspire younger generations to think green. The team represented India in the World Solar Challenge, 2015 and 2017.

== History ==
The RVCE Solar Car team was founded in September 2013, by Vikram R. Nath, a Class of 2016 Mechanical Engineer, along with four of his friends from different departments of RVCE. Guided by Prof. M.S. Krupashankar and Lt. Mahendra Kumar, the 18 member team designed and built their first solar car "Soleblaze" from scratch. The team is now one of the largest and most successful student teams in RVCE. The team made successful collaborations with about 30 leading companies from the industry, including Infosys, TCS, SunEdison, Wipro, SunPower, HHV Solar, Reinforced Plastic Industries, National Instruments, Altair, Weather Analytics, TE Connectivity, SanE, 3M, Mahindra Reva, Tritium, Keysight Technologies, Vicor, Molex, Ikoras Solar, Lapp India, Schneider Electric and many more. The team also received personal guidance from industry veterans, including Chetan Maini, founder of Mahindra REVA and Narayana Murthy, co-founder of Infosys.

The second generation team made further progress with sponsorship from IBM, Wipro, SunPower, HHV Solar, Rhinokore, SanE, Siemens Gamesa, ICP, Anabond, 3M, Honeywell, Bosch, Microsoft Research and many others.

== Projects ==
=== Soleblaze-1 ===
Soleblaze-1 is the first prototype of the RVCE Solar Car Team built by the founding team. The project was launched in October 2014 The car represented the country in the World Solar Challenge, 2015. It was one of the few teams that cleared static scrutineering in its initial attempt. However, the car failed to start in the race itself.

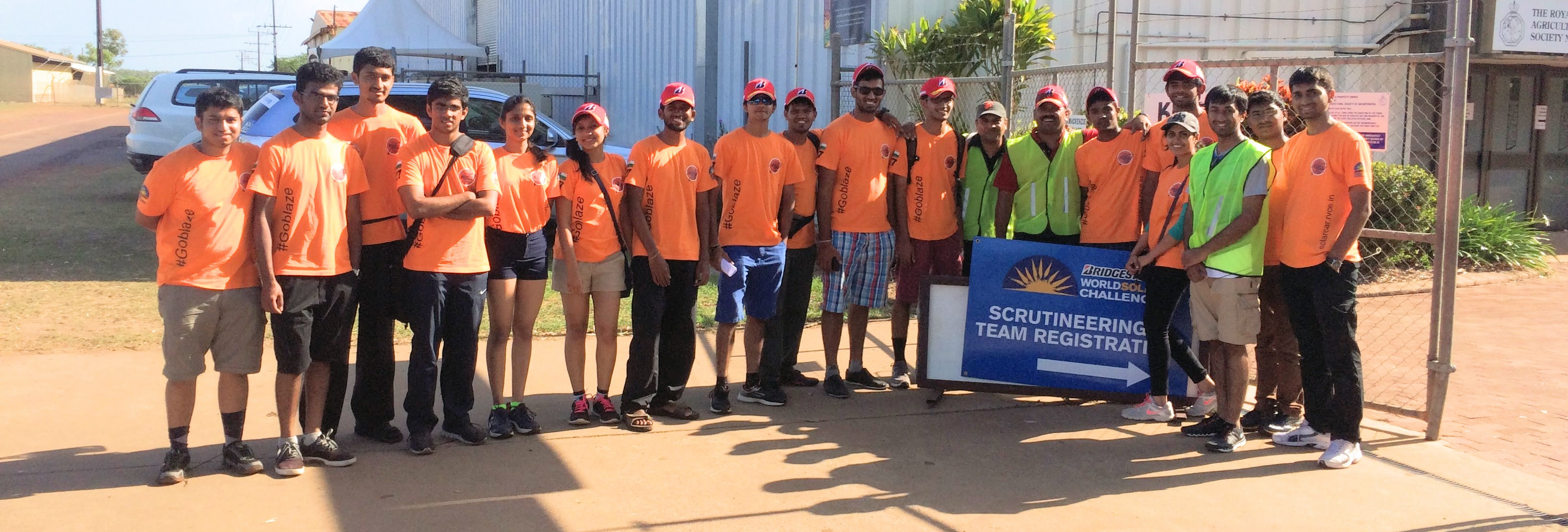
At the static scrutineering - WSC'15; Team from right to left: Lalit, Shivaraju, Vikram (Team Lead), Gamini, Sohan, Subbu, Lt. Mahendra Kumar, Prof. Krupashankar, Varun, Vaibhav, Akshar, Sharan, Ashray, Nancy, Nivedha, Aditya, Moiz, Gokul, Pramod

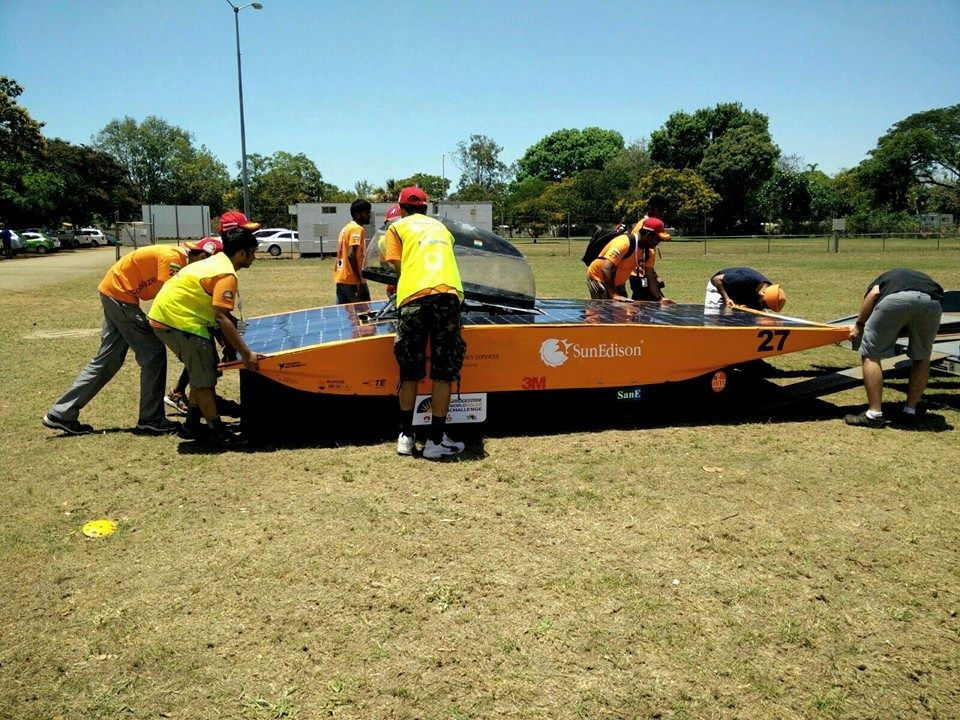
The team, working on the car before static scrutineering at WSC'15

Specifications:

Length	4485mm
Breadth	1790mm
Height	1235mm
Weight	277 kg
Suspensions	Double wishbone suspension (Aluminium 6060 T6)
Steering	Rack and pinion steering system
Brakes	Dual circuit hydraulic brake system, Regenerative braking
Chassis	Spaceframe Aluminium 6063 T6
Body	Carbon fibre 1.5mm shell
Solar array	6m2, Monocrystalline Silicon Cells SunPower C60 Cells wired in 3 parallel strings boosted by an MPPT
Drivetrain	Mitsuba 2 kW, Direct Drive in wheel motor.
Batteries	20 kg Lithium Ion Batteries Energy Capacity Estimate-5kWh
BMS	Tritium battery management system
Telemetry	National instruments- Compact RIO

Due to logistics related issues, the team could not race in the event.

=== Arka- 1 ===
Arka- 1 is the latest car of the RVCE Solar Car Team. The prototype was entirely designed and fabricated by the second generation of the team. It is a much improved version of the first car and was launched in August 2017. The car was India's lone entry to the World Solar Challenge, 2017. The team working on the project consists of 25 students from various departments of RVCE.

Specifications:

Length	3500mm
Breadth	1600mm
Height	1200mm
Weight	273 kg
Suspensions	Double wishbone suspension (Aluminium 6060 T6)
Steering	Rack and pinion steering system
Brakes	Dual circuit hydraulic brake system, Regenerative braking
Chassis	Monocoque, carbon fibre-structural foam sandwich structure
Body	Carbon fibre 1.5mm shell
Solar array	4m2, Monocrystalline Silicon Cells SunPower Maxeon Gen 2 Cells wired in 2 parallel strings boosted by an MPPT each
Drivetrain	Mitsuba M-2096 D III 2 kW, Direct Drive in wheel motor.
Batteries	20 kg Lithium Ion Batteries Energy Capacity Estimate-5kWh
BMS	Tritium battery management system

== See also ==
- Solar car racing
- Battery electric vehicle
- List of solar car teams
- World Solar Challenge
