= Top Dutch Solar Racing =

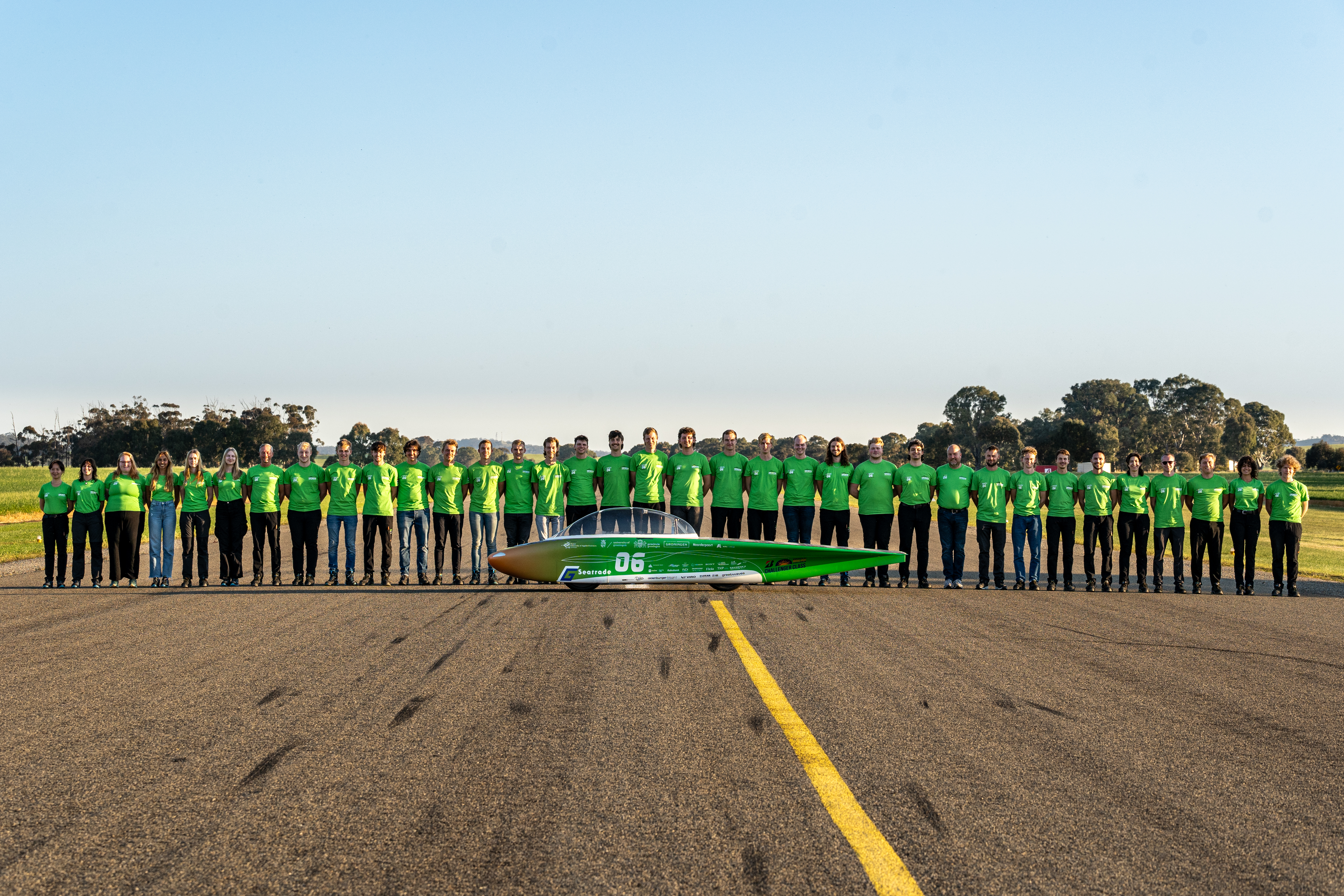
Top Dutch Solar Racing in October 2023 in Australia

Top Dutch Solar Racing (TDSR) is a student solar racing team from Groningen, the Netherlands. It was founded in February 2017 and participated twice in the challenger class of the Bridgestone World Solar Challenge (BWSC) for the first time in 2019. In 2021 Top Dutch Solar Racing built its second solar car and competed in the Moroccan Solar Challenge. In 2023, Top Dutch Solar Racing participated in the BWSC again with Green Thunder, the third solar car. The current iteration of the team, Team 2025, participated in the 2025 Bridgestone World Solar Challenge with their car, the Green Falcon.

Top Dutch Solar Racing is not affiliated with a specific university but rather consists of students from different levels of education. Most team members study at the University of Groningen, Hanze University of Applied Sciences or Noorderpoort Groningen. The team also includes international students.

== History ==
Top Dutch Solar Racing was founded in 2017 by Jeroen Brattinga, Frank Pot, Eldert Zeinstra and Vincent Taselaar who were all students at Hanze University of Applied Sciences at the time. Their goal was to contribute to sustainable innovations and technology by building a solar car. Within two years, the first generation of the team, consisting of 26 students, built the solar car Green Lightning.

In June 2020, Top Dutch Solar Racing started with a completely new team of students. The goal was to participate again in the Bridgestone World Solar Challenge. Due to the COVID-19 pandemic, the challenge was canceled in February 2021. In May 2021, the team announced its participation in the Moroccan Solar Challenge that was held in October 2021.

In June 2022, Top Dutch Solar Racing started the adventure of building a solar car and participating in the Bridgestone World Solar Challenge with its third team, with students from the University of Groningen, Hanze University of Applied Sciences, Alfa College and HAN University of Applied Sciences. The solar car was finished on time to compete in the 2023 edition of the Bridgestone World Solar Challenge.

In June of 2024, the next iteration of the team was formed with the intention of building the fourth solar car. The team again consisted of a diverse group of students from different educational institutions.

Once again, in June of 2026 the recruitment process of TDSR came to a close, introducing the new team. Team 27' spearheaded by the new team leader Sam Peters. This team consisted of 25 individuals from a multitude of differing backgrounds.

== Solar cars ==
=== Bambi ===
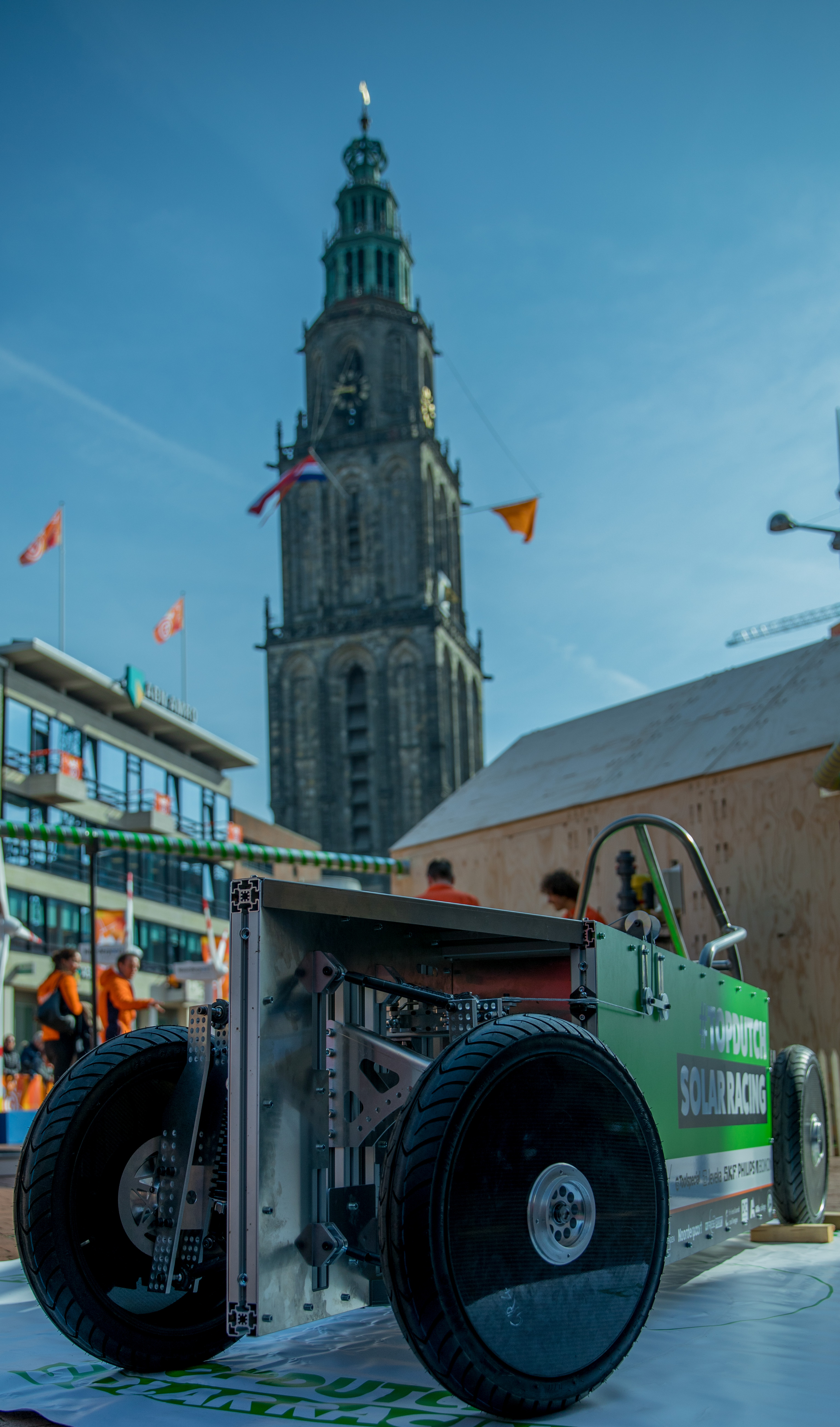
Kingsday 2018

In April 2018, the demonstration car 'Bambi' was presented to the King Willem-Alexander on Kingsday in Groningen. The demonstration car was used to show the capabilities of the team and test innovations that have been implemented in the first solar car Green Lightning. One of these innovations, was the steering mechanism where wires were used to steer the wheels.

=== Green Lightning ===
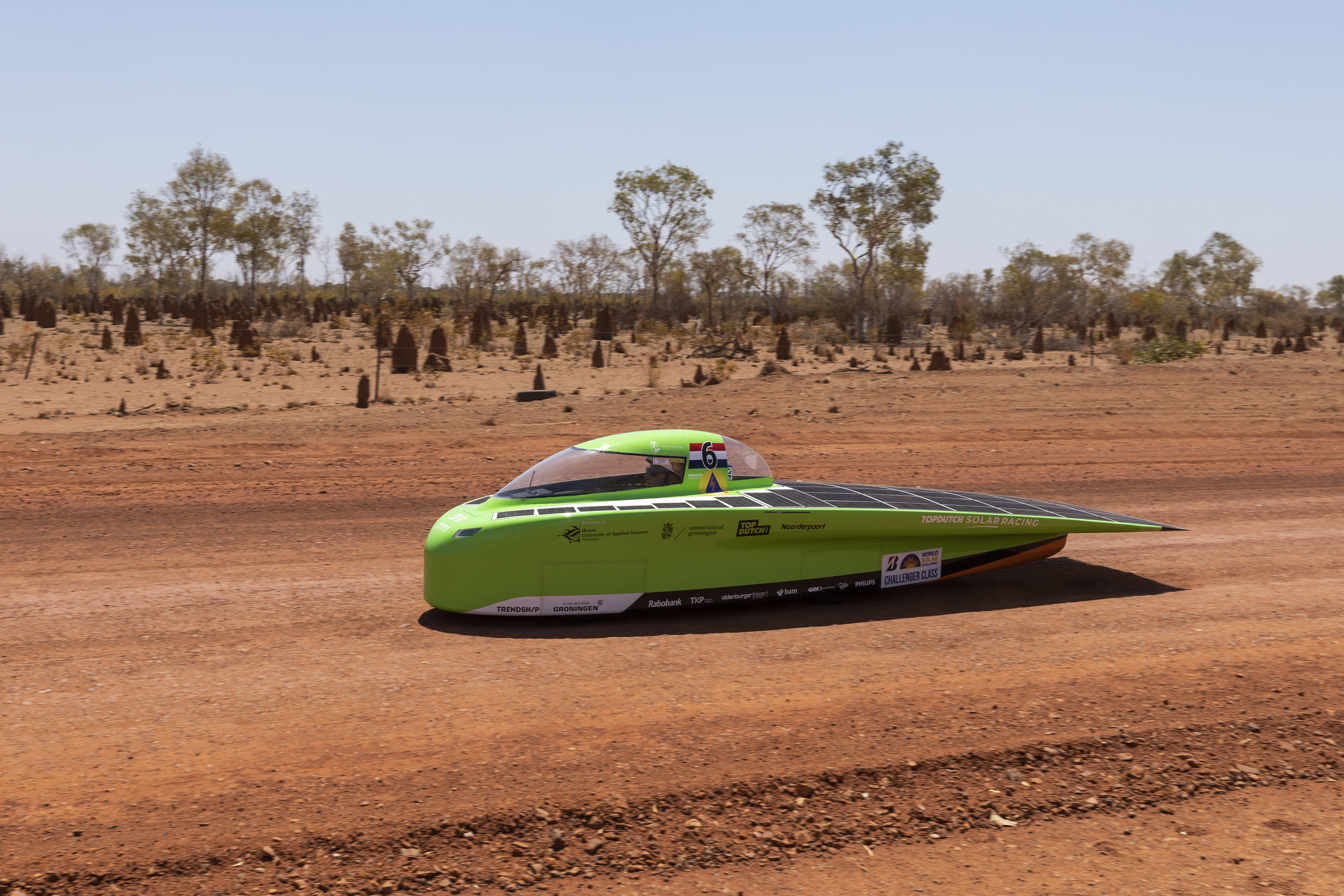
Green Lightning during the 2019 BWSC

Designed and built for the 2019 edition of the Bridgestone World Solar Challenge. The aerodynamic shape of Green Lightning was special for its time, as it was one of the first solar cars with a 'monohull', or 'bullet', shape. Next to the original shape, Green Lightning included innovations like the four-wheel steering system and the composite leaf springs. By using the four-wheel steering system, the solar car was able to drive at an angle, which reduced the aerodynamic drag. The composite leaf springs contributed to the stability of the vehicle and made the vehicle lighter. The total weight Green Lightning without a driver was 144.5 kilograms.

=== Green Spirit ===
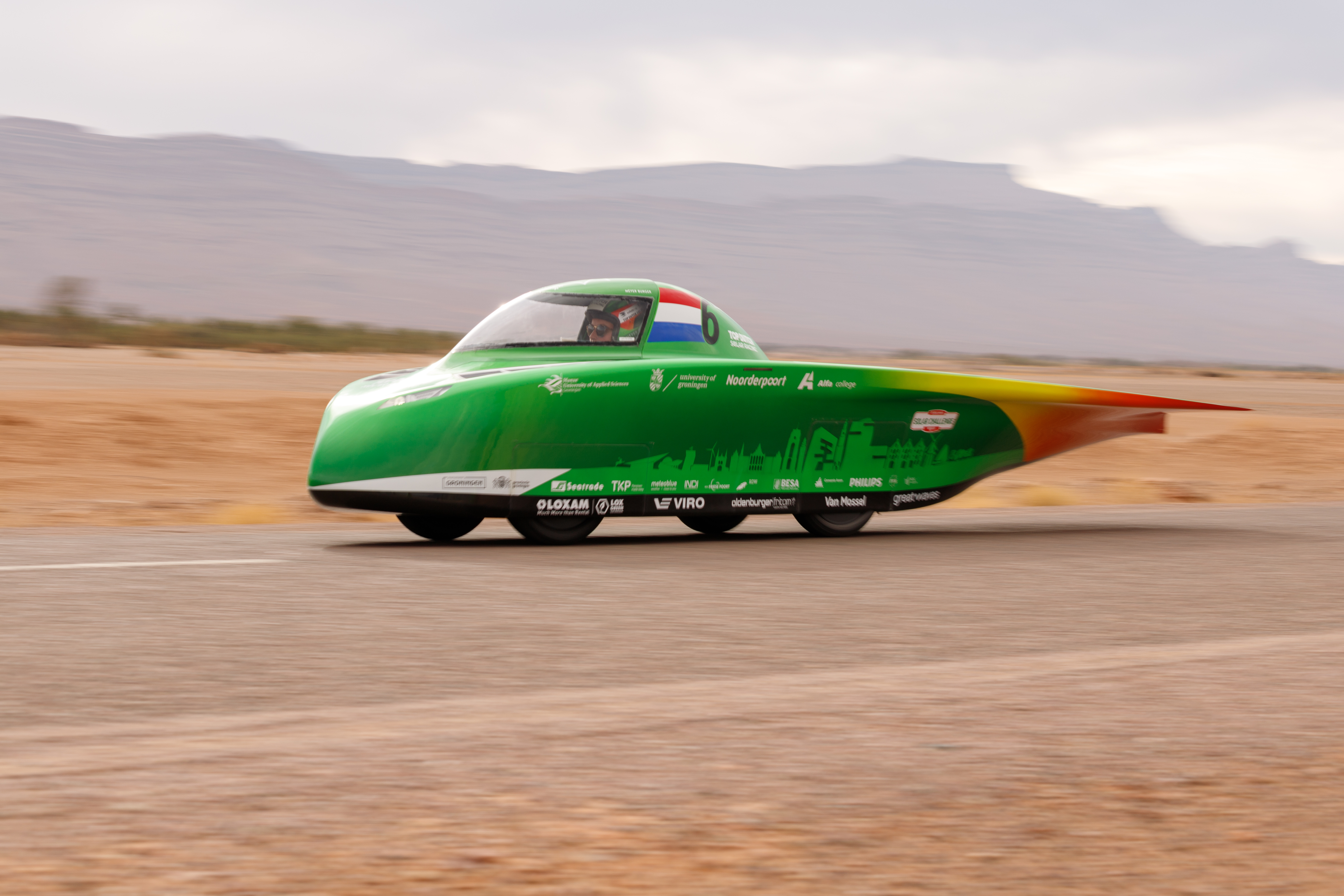
Green Spirit in the Moroccan Solar Challenge

Designed and built for the 2021 edition of the Bridgestone World Solar Challenge. However, after the cancellation of this event due COVID-19, the solar car participation in the 2021 Morocco Solar Race Challenge. Here Green Spirit managed to secure pole position. After an exciting race through the Atlas Mountains Green Spirit finished 4th. Green Spirit build on the legacy of Green Lightning with innovations like two coreless radial flux motors, a unique fully composite leaf spring suspension and a custom LiFePO_{4} battery. Due to different design decisions Green Spirit was with 200 kilograms heavier than its predecessor.

=== Green Thunder ===
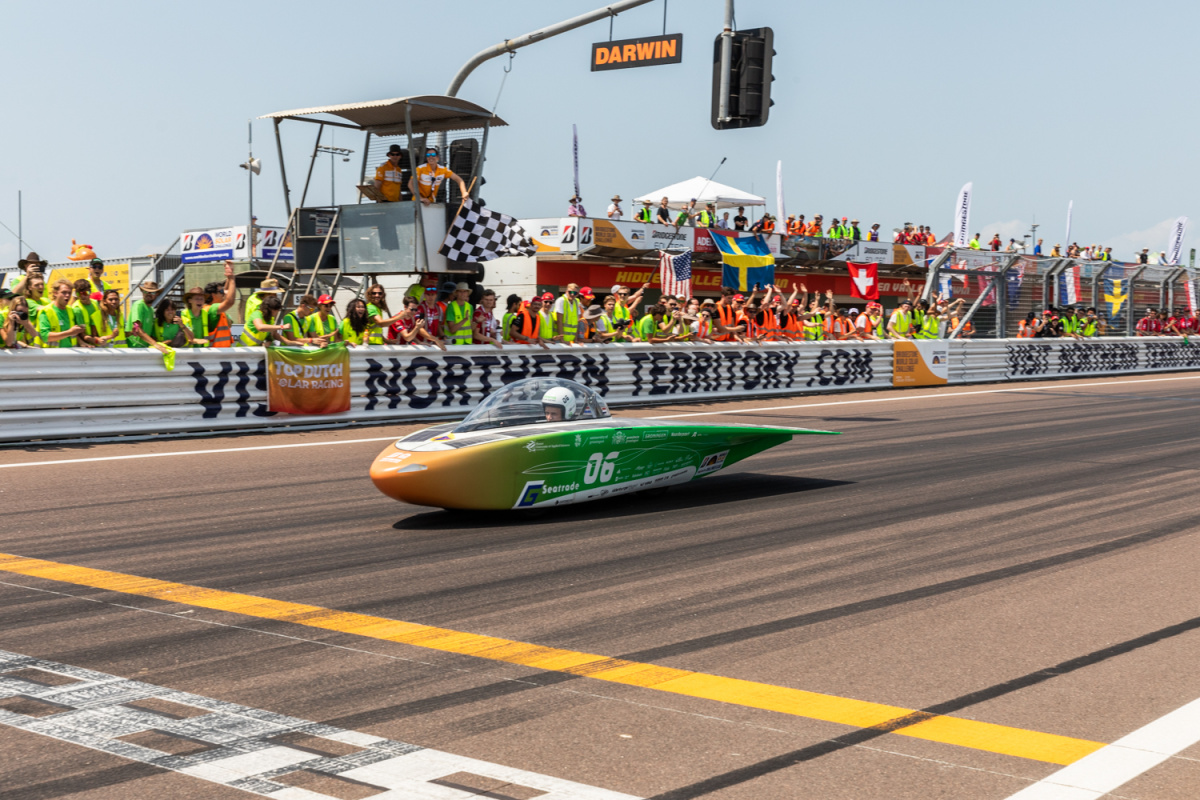
Green Thunder during qualifying

Designed and built for the 2023 edition of the Bridgestone World Solar Challenge. Green Thunder had already been through a lot before ending up at the start line as 4th. During one test moments on the open road near Coober Pedy, the solar deck blew off the car, leaving some solar modules damaged. Unless this setback, the team was not beaten yet and determined to go for the maximum result. For Green Thunder the maximum result was 6th place in the 2023 Bridgestone World Solar Challenge. Green Thunder had some special innovations under its belt. The tandem perovskite solar cells were one of them, these cells are an alternative to the traditional silicon-based solar cells. Other innovations were made for example on the rear suspension, which was mounted on the unusual side of the wheels. Green Thunder qualified in 4th place on the Hidden Valley Raceway track. After an exciting race through bushfires and strong crosswinds Green Thunder finished the 2023 BWSC in 6th position.

=== Green Falcon ===
Designed and built for the 2025 edition, Green Fallcon would be the first-ever Catamaran design in the history of Top Dutch Solar Racing. The newly released BWSC regulations would increase the effective solar deck area to 6 m^{2} from the usual 4m^{2}, at the cost of halving the effective energy storage. As a result, the team decided to utilize a "Catamaran" design for the first time in Top Dutch's history. This design would incorporate three custom-made airfoils to increase the efficiency of the car and make it more aerodynamic. Another innovative idea was a "ride-height" adaptable suspension system. This would effectively allow the driver to manipulate the car's height using its hydraulic dampers, which in turn would decrease the aerodynamic drag. The car qualified 2nd at the Hidden Valley Raceway track during the qualifications. Towards the end of the competition, the car encountered a critical mechanical failure on the outskirts of the finish line and was unable to finish the challenge, ending up in 15th place.

== Achievements ==
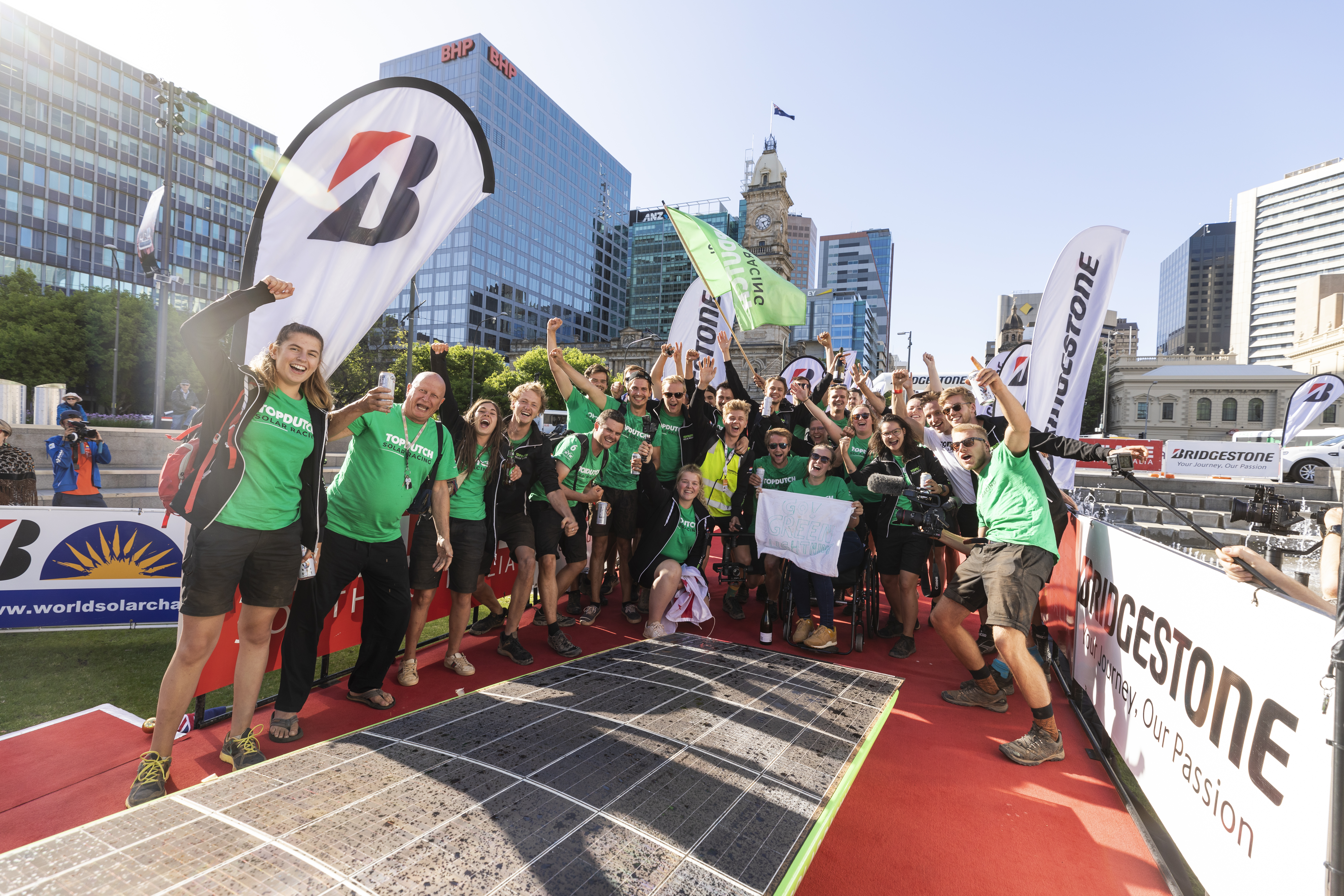
Top Dutch Solar Racing at the finishing line of the BWSC 2019

On October 13, 2019, Top Dutch Solar Racing started in the pole position of the 15th Bridgestone World Solar Challenge in Darwin, Australia. Five days later, on October 18, 2019, Green Lightning reached Adelaide and finished 4th after Bluepoint of Agoria Solar Team, Tokai Challenger of Tokai University Solar Car Team and Electrum of University of Michigan Solar Car Team. Due to technical issues and accidents of Solar Team Twente and Vattenfall Solar Team, Top Dutch Solar Racing was the best Dutch team participating in the challenger class during the BWSC 2019. The team also received the Excellence in Engineering Award as recognition for its good performance considering the lack of experience of the team.

Between September 21 and September 23, 2020, Top Dutch Solar Racing participated in the iLumen European Solar Challenge in Heusden-Zolder, Belgium. Besides winning the dynamic parcours challenge, the team won third place at the 24-hour race with 302 completed laps and set a track record of 2:42:767. This was done TDSR's first solar car; Green Lightning.

On October 22, 2023, Top Dutch Solar Racing started in fourth position on the 16th Bridgestone World Solar Challenge in Darwin, Australia. Six days later, on October 27, 2023, Green Thunder reached Adelaide and finished 6th. Next to this, the team received the Safety Award as the jury was impressed by the safe working methods. Especially the way the team carried out their roadside repairs received praise from the jury.

September 20th, 2026 marked an important day for TDSR placing third at the iLumen European Solar Challenge for the second time in their history. For the first time, TDSR entered the competition with 2 cars, Green Thunder and Green Falcon both having a top 5 finish (GT: 4th; GF: 3rd).

== See also ==
- List of solar car teams
- Solar car racing
- List of prototype solar-powered cars
