= Sunseeker (solar vehicle) =

Solar-powered car project

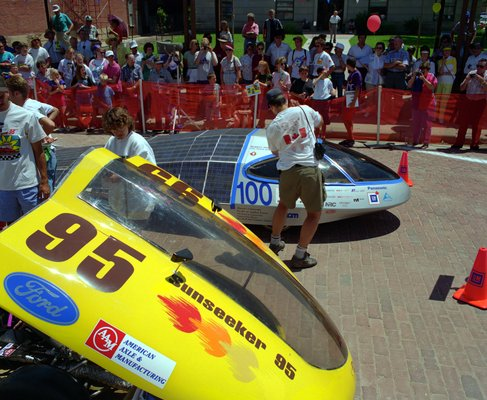
Sunseeker (front) at a midday stop in Sunrayce 1995

The Sunseeker Solar Car Project, Sunseeker for short, is Western Michigan University's solar car team. Each vehicle is designed, built, maintained, and raced by students. Sunseeker has competed in all of the American Solar Challenge events, going back to 1990.

The mission of the Sunseeker Solar Car Project is to design, build, and race solar powered vehicles to advance and demonstrate the abilities of the renewable energy technologies. When not racing, the team participates in numerous events, where they show their cars to the public.

== History ==
=== 1990 ===
In 1990, WMU's Sunseeker competed in the General Motors sponsored Sunrayce USA that ran from Orlando, Florida, to Warren, Michigan. With over 1600 miles and 38 competitors, Sunseeker 77 finished in 8th place.

=== 1991 ===
In 1991, Sunseeker competed in two Arizona solar challenges. One of them was the Solar and Electric 500 at Phoenix International Speedway where Sunseeker received the honor of 5th place. Sunseeker placed an impressive 2nd place in the Arizona Governor's Cup Solar Challenge, a 2.5 mile Grand Prix course through the streets of Phoenix, Arizona.

=== 1993 ===
In 1993, GM was joined by the DOE, National Renewable Energy Laboratories and EDS to sponsor the solar challenge. The Sunrayce ran from Dallas, Texas to Minneapolis, Minnesota. Rain and clouds contributed to a disappointing 18th place for Sunseeker 93.

=== 1995 ===
The NREL, EDS, and GM together sponsored the 1995 Sunrayce. The route ran from the Indianapolis Speedway to Denver, Colorado. Sunseeker 95 took advantage of the excellent chassis from the previous race and built a new array, installed a new power train, refined the aerodynamics, and formed a new strategy. These changes allowed Sunseeker to place 8th in a competitive field of 36 cars.

=== 1997 ===
The 1997 Sunrayce ran from Indianapolis to Colorado Springs, Colorado, with the DOE, EDS and General Motors as its sponsors. The team built an entirely new vehicle for 1997. Sunseeker 97 finished in 16th-place.

=== 1999 ===
1999 brought about a whole new aerodynamic body design that was different from all previous Sunseeker designs. There was only one problem: rain. Nine of the ten race days from Washington, D.C., to Orlando, Florida, were plagued with overcast and rain. The rain damaged one of Sunseeker's two motors, which had to be taken apart and dried. On the last and only sunny day of the race, Sunseeker 454 passed more than 20 competitors and finished 3rd for the day, but still finished in 26th position overall.

=== 2001 ===
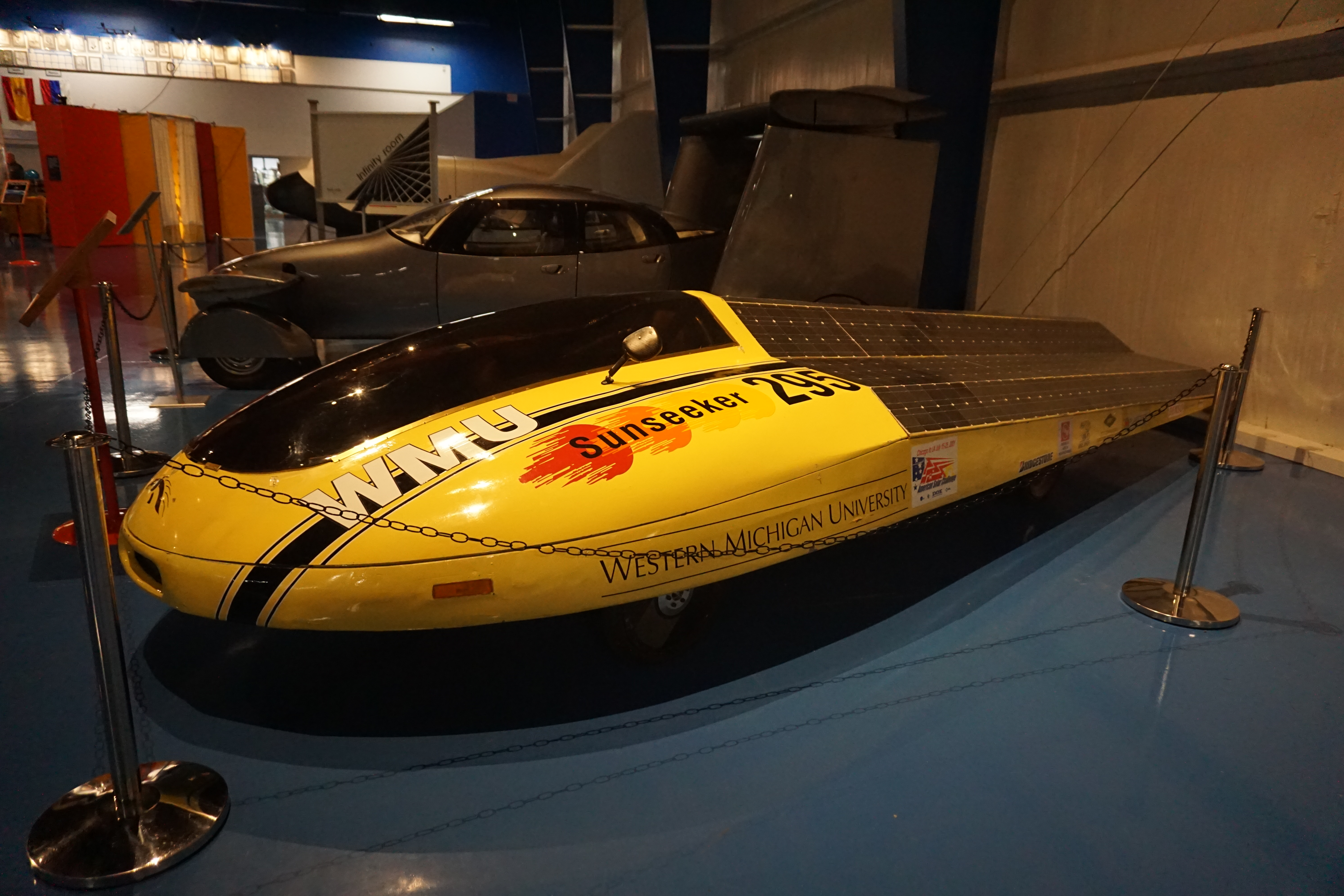
Sunseeker 295 at the Air Zoo

The first American Solar Challenge race in 2001 was sponsored by EDS, the DOE, and NREL. WMU hosted scrutineering where the solar cars are inspected for mechanical, electrical and safety requirements. Sunseeker 95 was modified with a new array panel and more efficient solar cells. The wheels were replaced with the carbon fiber wheels used on the 1999 car. A number of other modifications were made and the car was renamed Sunseeker 295. After a 2400-mile race from Chicago to Los Angeles down Route 66, it finished 5th in Stock Class and 23rd overall.

=== 2003 ===
For WMU's Centennial in 2003, the team reduced the 1999 car's length and width and constructed an all composite body and chassis of carbon fiber and honeycomb, designed a new rear suspension, built a high efficiency solar array, and installed the hub motors from the '99 car. Entered in the Open Class, again following Route 66, Sunseeker 03 captured 5th place in the race, sporting car number 786. It also won the Inspector's Award for best mechanical and electrical design, the Sportsmanship Award, the Most Improved Award, and EDS's Gold Award for Best Solar Car Design.

=== 2005 ===
For 2005, the race became the North American Solar Challenge as the route started in Austin, Texas, and ran north to Winnipeg, Manitoba, then west to Calgary, Alberta. It was the longest solar car race ever at 2500 miles (4000 km). Sunseeker 03 was given a new canopy, stronger rear suspension, improved aerodynamics and renamed Sunseeker 05. With no mechanical or electrical breakdowns, car number 786 crossed the finish line in 6th place and took home the Aesthetics Award for the prettiest car.

Sunseeker 05 can still be seen in public events, such as the Kalamazoo Holiday Parade, along with other past Sunseeker solar cars.

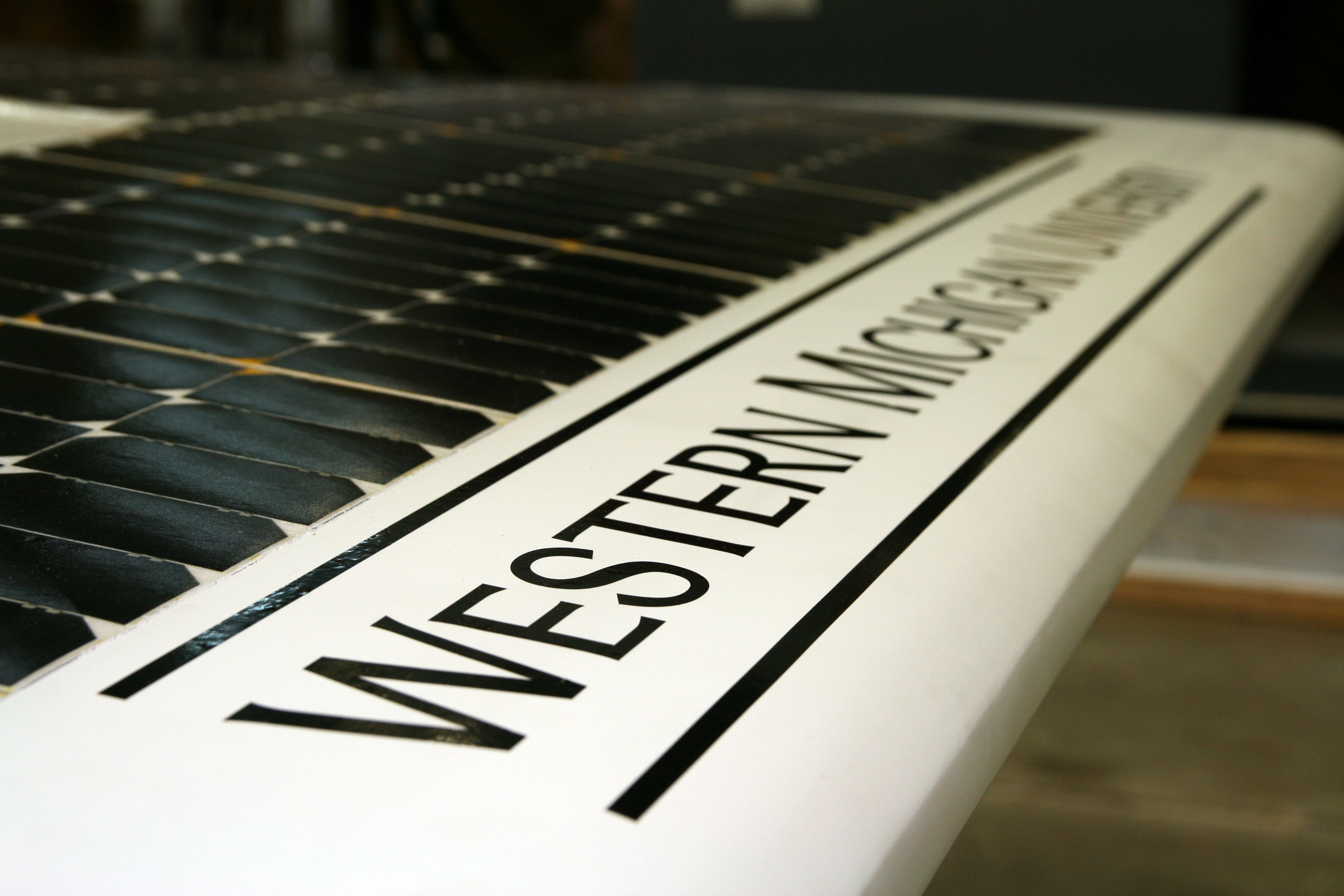
The 2008 Sunseeker solar array with gallium arsenide (GaAs) multijunction cells

=== 2008 ===
A radical change in driver seating for the 2008 solar challenge caused all teams to build totally new cars. Sunseeker 08 used the very efficient array from the previous car and was changed to a front wheel drive quasi three wheel vehicle since the two rear wheels were about a foot apart behind the cockpit bulge. However, the array blew off the car during qualifying and the car could not participate in the event. WMU team members joined other teams to assist during the race. At the award ceremony after the race, they received the Sportsmanship Award to a long round of applause.

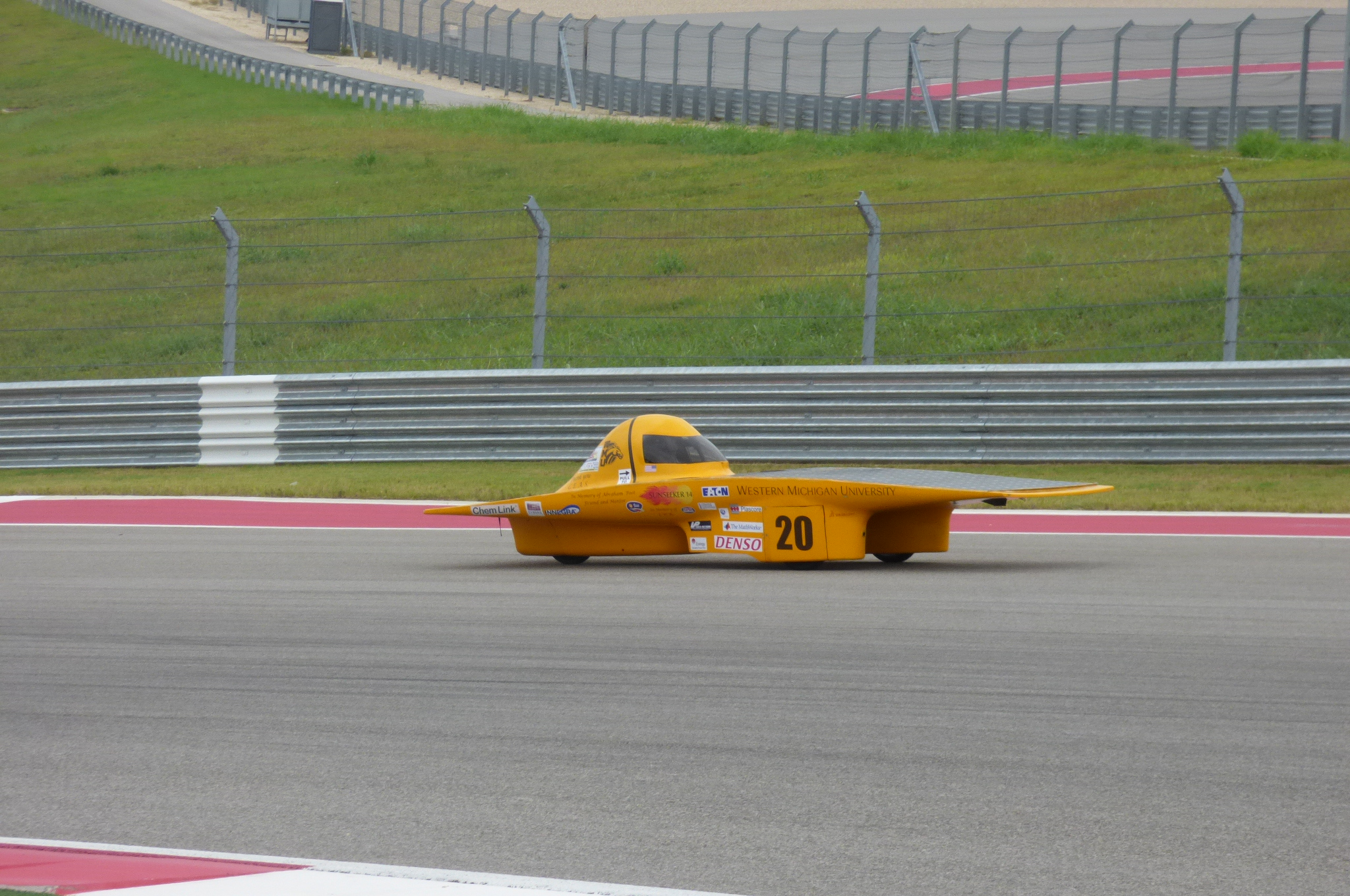
The 2010 car racing towards the top of the hill at turn one at Circuit of the Americas during the 2014 Formula Sun Grand Prix Powered by Austin Energy

=== 2010–2014 ===
For 2010, the team introduced a new solar car to compete in the American Solar Challenge. The vehicle was the first, and remains as the only three-wheeled design produced by the team. It has two powered wheels in the front, and a single unpowered wheel in the back. It is considered an experimental motorcycle by the Michigan Secretary of State.

Each of the two CISIRO motors produce 6 horsepower, and enable the 600 pound (without a driver) car to travel at most 80 miles per hour. During races, however, the car's top speed was limited to 45 miles per hour in order to keep it running efficiently.

The 2010 car raced in three American Solar Challenge road races, and five Formula Sun Grand Prix races.

=== 2015–2019 ===
During the Fall 2014 semester, the team began working on the next generation Sunseeker solar car.(Code named Farasi) The car incorporates four wheels, with the two rear wheels being powered. The aeroshell is made of light-weight carbon fiber, while the chassis is made of carbon fiber and chromoly steel. This car was meant to be raced in the 2016 American Solar Challenge but didn't get to compete until the 2017 Formula Sun Grand Prix at Circuit of the Americas in Austin, TX. In 2018 Farasi completed 163 laps at Motorsports Park Hastings for the Formula Sun Grand Prix and ran 52 miles of the American Solar Challenge under a conditional qualification.

=== 2020–Present ===
The current solar car was started in Fall 2018 when the students began the design process. During Spring 2019, the team began their build cycle, though COVID-19 posed issues for the team in 2020 and into 2021. In the spring and summer of 2021, the team completed the new car, dubbed Aethon, and competed in the 2021 Formula Sun Grand Prix, though they did not qualify for the 2021 American Solar Challenge.

Aethon is powered by a custom-built silicon-based solar array and propelled by a single Marand high-efficiency electric motor. It is the team's first asymmetric style car, also known as a catamaran, where the driver sits in-line with the wheels on one side of the car, as opposed to all of the team's previous cars which had the driver seated, or reclined in a number of the cars before 2008, along the centerline of the vehicle.

Aethon entered into the Formula Sun Grand Prix for 2022 and placed 8th, in the single-occupant vehicle class, out of the 13 teams who made it through scrutineering. It performed 85 laps at Heartland Motorsports Park in Topeka, Kansas, totaling over 212 miles with a personal fastest lap time of 4 minutes and 2 seconds.

Aethon raced for the final time in the 2023 Formula Sun Grand Prix at Heartland Motorsports Park in Topeka, Kansas. It placed 5th overall in the single-occupant vehicle class, with 127 laps completed over the course of the event. Following the event, Aethon was retired in favor of Sunseeker's newest car, Sunseeker 23, which was unveiled to the public in October 2023.

Sunseeker 23 will be competing for the first time in July 2024 in the Formula Sun Grand Prix and the American Solar Challenge. The 2024 Formula Sun Grand Prix will take place at the National Corvette Museum Motorsports Park in Bowling Green, Kentucky. The American Solar Challenge will begin in Nashville, TN and conclude in Casper, Wyoming.

Sunseeker 23 competed in the 2024 Formula Sun Grand Prix. After a grueling week for the Sunseeker team, which included BPS (battery protection system) issues, a suspension failure, and multiple other setbacks, Sunseeker 23 was able to make it onto the track between 11:00 am and noon on the final day of racing. The car was able to put down 40 labs and one penalty finishing 14th overall. They were also able to qualify conditionally for the American Solar Challenge. Unfortunately, just 10 minutes shy of fully qualifying for the rest of the race one of Sunseeker 23's motor controllers shorted causing them to not quality at the first check point. Not knowing what caused the issue, the team decided to withdraw from the competition with their heads held high. The team is proud of what they were able to accomplish during this competition and plans to bring the same car to next year's Formula Sun Grand Prix.
