= Anabond =

Anabond Limited
- Company type: Limited
- Industry: Chemical Industries, Powder Metal, New Product Research and Development
- Founded: 1979
- Headquarters: Anabond Limited, No. 36, Type-II Dr.V.S.I.Estate, Thiruvanmiyur, Chennai- 600 041 India
- Key people: Mr. Rajan, (Managing Director); Mr. M.S.Abraham, (Joint Managing Director); Mr. J.V.Sembian, (Director); Mr. Stiva Vijayakumar, (Director); Mrs. Priyanka Mohanraj, (Director); Dr. G.Periaswami, (Director); Mr. K. Adhinarayanan, (Independent Director); Mr. William Stephen Aruldoss, (Independent Director); Mr. Balasubramaniam Sriram, (Independent Director)
- Products: Adhesives, Sealant Products,
- Website: www.anabond.com

Anabond is the registered brand name of products manufactured by Anabond Limited, a company headquartered in Thiruvanmiyur, Chennai, India. It manufactures engineering adhesives and sealants which are used in automobile and engineering product manufacturing, electrical and electronic products manufacturing and maintenance of these equipment's. Anabond was the first company in India to manufacture anaerobic adhesives and sealants.

Anabond was established by J. Vijayakumar scientist from the Indira Gandhi Centre for Atomic Research (IGCAR), Kalpakkam in 1979 after he resigned from IGCAR. Now it has over 500 people working in various functions. It has fully dedicated R&D centre at Perungudi, Chennai and production facilities in Chennai, Puducherry and Assam . The R&D centre carries out research in different areas such as anaerobic adhesives (anaerobic sealants), epoxies, silicone sealants, and rubber-based adhesives. They also collaborated with Indian Space Research Organisation and Defence Research and Development Organisation in developing products for them to use in their space and missile programmes.
