= PrISUm =

Student-run solar car project from Iowa State

PrISUm Solar Car is the multidisciplinary student-run solar car racing team from Iowa State University that designs and builds solar powered vehicles to compete in the American Solar Challenge (ASC). The club was founded in 1989 by a group of engineering honor students from Tau Beta Pi and was simply known as the ISU Solar Car Project. In 1990, the team adopted the name of its first car, PrISUm.

== Achievements ==
- Since 1989, Team PrISUm has built and raced 14 different cars and is one of only a handful of teams to have qualified and raced a new vehicle for almost every Sunrayce and American Solar Challenge races.
- Team PrISUm made the first solar car from the state of Iowa with its entrance in the 1990 GM Sunrayce USA.

== Team Composition ==
Team PrISUm consists of about 120 team members from the Iowa State University campus and welcomes students from all majors interested in working on any aspect of the diverse project. The team has three distinct divisions that are each necessary for successfully designing, racing, and teaching the public about solar cars.

- The Electrical Division is responsible for designing and building the battery system, solar array, power electronics, controls and software for the car.
- The Mechanical Division is responsible for the design, testing, and fabrication of the outside shell of the vehicle and all the mechanical components for the car.
- The Business Division is responsible for fundraising, project budgeting, outreach, recruiting, and media.

== Cars by year ==
- 1990: ‘’PrISUm’’: GM Sunrayce USA: Placed 17 out of 34; Best Teamwork, Day 7; Most Improved, Day 5
- 1993: ‘’PrISUm II’’: Sunrayce: Placed 10 out of 36
- 1995: ‘’PrISUm CYnergy’’: Sunrayce: Placed 19 out of 38; an accident at over 45mph on the last day totaled the car, but left the driver with a minor leg fracture
- 1997: ‘’PrISUm ExCYtor’’: Sunrayce: Placed 26 out of 36
- 1999: ‘’PrISUm Phoenix’’: Sunrayce: Qualified 1st place, Finished 2nd place in Stock Class; 5th out of 29 overall; Formula Sun: 4th place finish
- 2001: ‘’PrISUm Odyssey’’: ASC: Placed 16 out of 30
- 2003: ‘’PrISUm Spectrum’’: ASC: Placed 18 out of 20
- 2005: ‘’PrISUm Fusion’’: Formula Sun: 1st place in stock class; 2nd place overall; NASC: Placed 11 out of 20; 3rd place in Stock Class
- 2008: ‘’PrISUm Sol Invictus’’: NASC: Placed 8th out of 15
- 2010: "PrISUm Anthelion": ASC: Placed 11th out of 13
- 2011: "PrISUm Anthelion": FSGP: Placed 4th out of 10
- 2012: "PrISUm Hyperion": ASC: Placed 2nd out of 12; Fast lap during FSGP, Best electrical and mechanical system design awards
- 2013: "PrISUm Hyperion": FSGP: Placed 3rd out of 9; Fast lap
- 2014: "PrISUm Phaeton": ASC: Placed 3rd out of 10; Fast lap during FSGP, Best mechanical system design award
- 2015: "PrISUm Phaeton": FSGP: Placed 1st out of 15; Fast lap
