= FH Aachen =

University of Applied Sciences Aachen

FH Aachen – University of Applied Sciences
- Motto: Praktisch gut. Theoretisch auch.
- Motto in English: Good in practice. And in theory.
- Type: Public
- Established: 1971
- Chancellor: Prof. Dr. Thomas Ritz
- Faculty: 520
- Administrative staff: 700
- Students: 15.100 (WS 2020/2021)
- Location: Aachen and Jülich, North Rhine-Westphalia, Germany; 50°45′25.11″N 6°5′42.77″E
- Campus: 4 Urban Campus in Aachen 1 Rural Campus in Jülich
- Colors: Mint, White and Black
- Website: fh-aachen.de

The FH Aachen – Aachen University of Applied Sciences is one of the biggest Fachhochschulen in Germany with roughly 15,000 students, 250 professors, 470 contract lecturers, and 340 assistants. It is specialized in certain topical areas (e.g. technology, engineering, business, design).

The FH Aachen ranks as the first best among the Universities of Applied Sciences in Germany in the fields of Electrical, Mechanical engineering and Informatics. Ten Faculties offer 53 Bachelor's, 22 Master's and three cooperative degree programmes.

The FH Aachen is situated in Aachen and in Jülich.

== History ==
The FH Aachen was established in 1971 as a result of the amalgamation of several universities of applied sciences and vocational training centres. Thus, it can look back on a practice-oriented educational tradition going back more than 100 years. The Federal Framework Law for Education in 1976 raised the legal status of all Fachhochschulen to a position equal to that of traditional universities. Within the context of law, the FH Aachen, like all other FHs, is autonomous, meaning that freedom of teaching, research and academic self-administration are guaranteed rights.

== Faculties ==
- Faculty 1: Architecture
- Faculty 2: Civil Engineering
- Faculty 3: Chemistry and Biotechnology
- Faculty 4: Arts and Design
- Faculty 5: Electrical Engineering and IT
- Faculty 6: Aerospace Engineering
- Faculty 7: Business Studies
- Faculty 8: Mechanical Engineering and Mechatronics
- Faculty 9: Medical technology and Applied mathematics
- Faculty 10: Energy technology

== Degree programmes ==
FH Aachen offers 48 Bachelor's, 22 Master's and three cooperative degree programmes. Dual degree programmes have been developed in recent years at the FH Aachen in close cooperation with the Chambers of Industry and Commerce (IHK). Some of the degree programmes have an international focus (IOS), which means that the courses are given in English during the first two semesters and in German in the following semesters.

== Locations ==
Seven of the ten faculties, with a total of over 8,000 students, are located in Aachen: Architecture, Civil Engineering, Design, Electrical Engineering and Information Technology, Aerospace Engineering, Business Studies, Mechanical Engineering and Mechatronics. Furthermore, the Rectorate, the Head Office and the Central Library are also here. Three faculties with more than 3,000 students altogether are located in Jülich: Chemistry and Biotechnology, Medical Technology and Applied Mathematics as well as Energy Technology. All services for students, such as academic counselling, the Department of International Affairs, the Registrar's Office, department libraries, student dormitories and cafeterias, are available both in Aachen and in Jülich. While the Jülich site displays a campus atmosphere since all facilities are together in one place, the Aachen site is not a campus university. Its facilities are spread across the city of Aachen in seven buildings, some of which have a long tradition.

== International activities ==
The FH Aachen maintains partnerships with 170 universities around the world. The students benefit from this cross-border network because it enables them to gain valuable overseas experience in the framework of their studies. The Department of International Affairs is the contact concerning all international topics at the FH Aachen.

=== Department of International Affairs ===
The Department of International Affairs provides services for international students, researchers and academic staff, as well as for students of FH Aachen University of Applied Sciences who would like to spend a period abroad. Furthermore, it centralizes, coordinates and handles international cooperation activities at the university.

Some of the activities offered include: support for international students and academic staff, advice for German students who plan to study abroad, coordination of cooperation with international organizations, support in cooperation and partnership agreements with universities worldwide, allocation of scholarships to international and German students, advice to faculties regarding third-party funding and international recruitment, information to the university community about the various international programs available within the scope of higher education, and ensure the presence of the Aachen FH University of Applied Sciences at international educational meetings and forums.

=== Freshman Institute ===
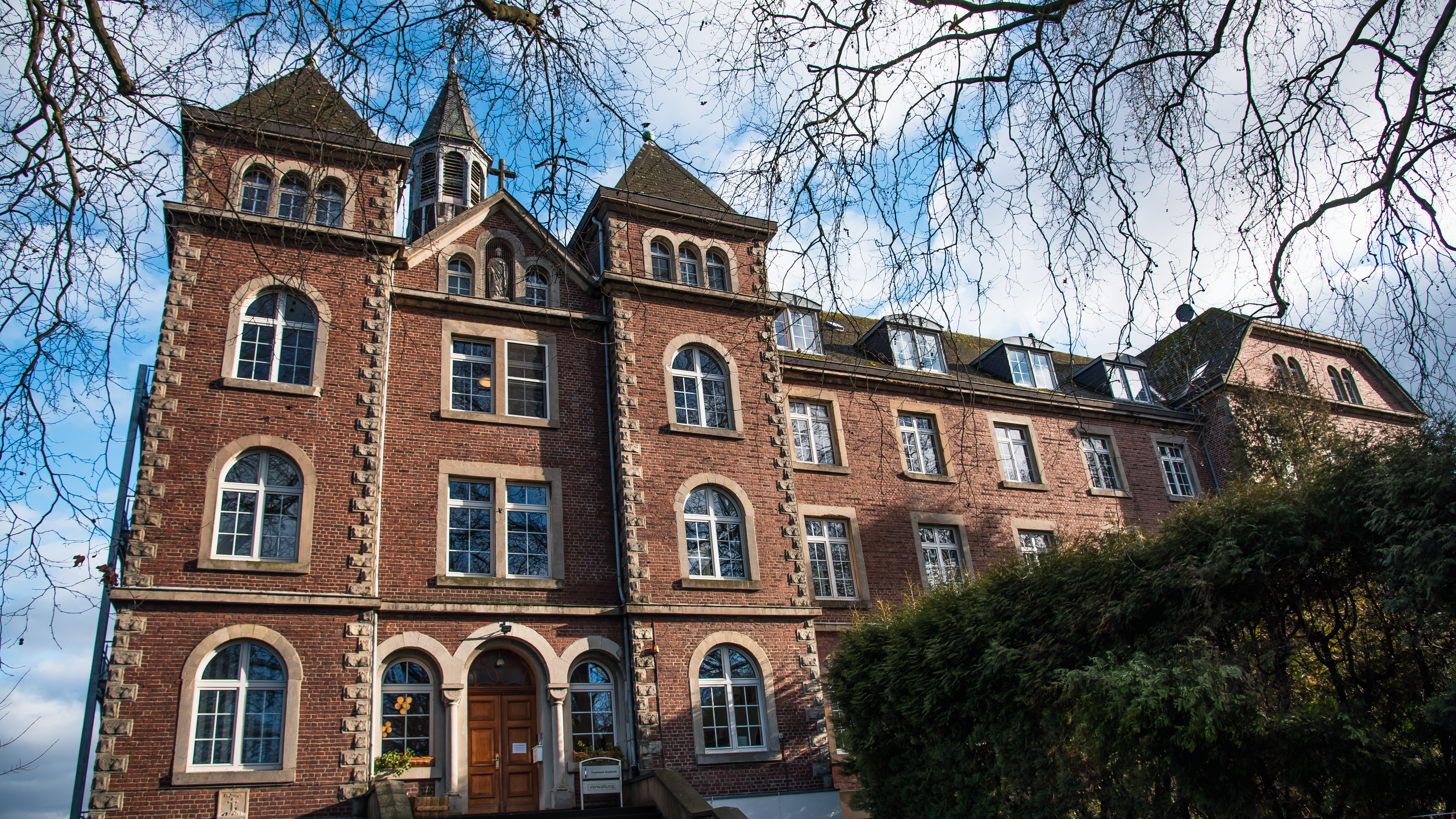
Freshman Program Main Building

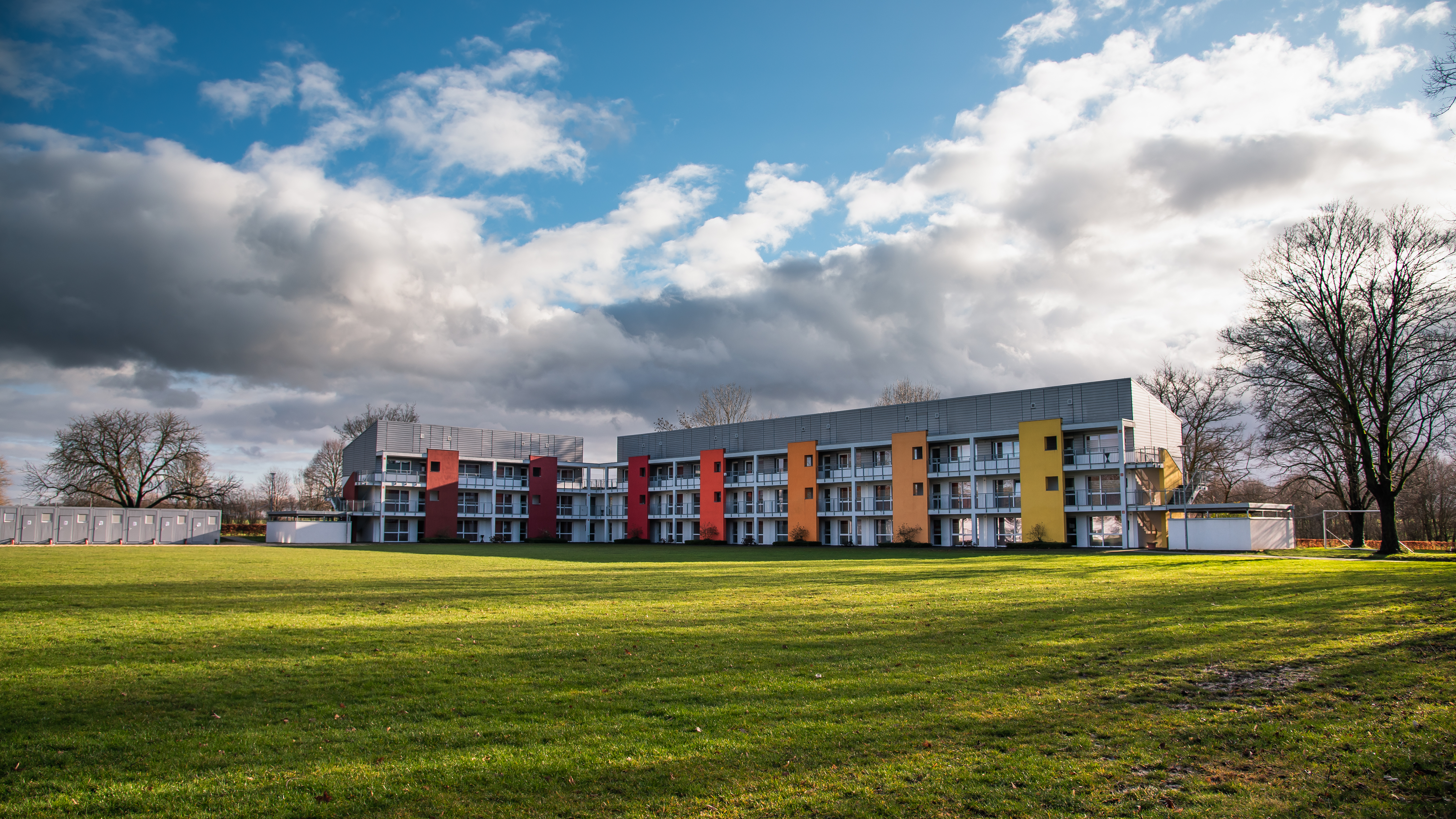
One of several student dormitories on the Freshman Campus in Geilenkirchen

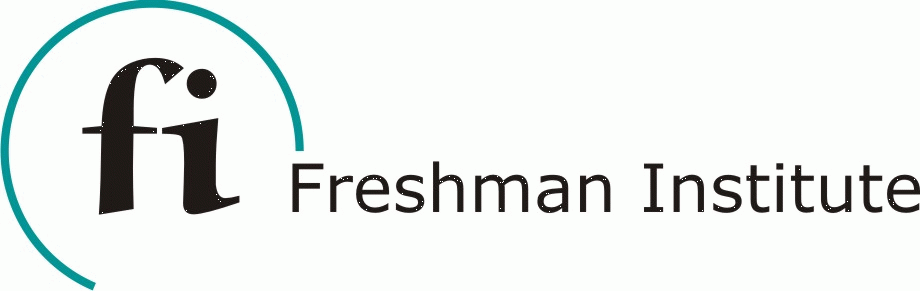
FI logo

The Freshman Institute (FI) is the central academic institution of FH Aachen and runs the Freshman Program (FH Aachen preparatory college = Studienkolleg) in cooperation with the Aachen Institute of Applied Sciences (AcIAS e.V.).

The goal of the Freshman Program foundation or bridging course is to qualify international applicants for a bachelor’s degree program in Germany. A separate entrance exam replaces the standard admission requirements to German universities as established by the German Standing Conference of the Ministers of Education and Cultural Affairs (ZaB) for both the German and English language programs. The approximately 300 international students attend the Freshman Program each year in Geilenkirchen, Germany, on the boarding school-type campus. The program focuses on preparing students to study engineering, business and economics or medicine. A unique highlight is the possibility to start in English and progress to studying in German. In addition to the FH Aachen, partner universities for the Freshman Institute include the University of Duisburg-Essen, the South Westphalia University of Applied Sciences and the FH Dortmund.

- History of the Freshman Program:

2025

• Academic Director of Freshman Institute as of 1 January 2025: Prof. Dr. Linda Steuer-Dankert
• Managing Director as of 1 January 2025: Dipl.-Reg.-Wiss.-LA Susanne Jaehnig
• Addition of study options in the English to German track through bachelor's degree programs at the FH Dortmund

2023

• New Director as of 1 September 2023: Prof. Dr.-Ing. Hans-Josef Ackermann

2022

• The first graduates of the English Track FeP were all been accepted into English-language bachelor's degree programs in North Rhine-Westphalia.
• Many students in the English to German Track without previous knowledge of German took part in an online beginner German language course in August and September and so were better prepared to start the Freshman Program.

2021

• Through hybrid classes, Freshman students both on campus and still in their home countries could learn together, which was a bit frustrating when some students lived in overseas and had to get up early or stayed up late for the lectures. Also, the timetable was just copied from the pre-pandemic period; therefore, it was not so effective.
• Most of the Freshman students were able to come to Germany and were able to interact with each other on campus.
• Online entrance exams enabled the participation of applicants worldwide, increasing international diversity.
• The English Feststellungsprüfung (FeP) program started. After the Freshman Program, students can apply to any English-language bachelor's degree program only in North Rhine-Westphalia.

2020

• Everything was different in 2020, but travel bans, closed embassies, and health and security regulations didn't stop the Freshman Program 2020/2021 from starting in October 2020. By the end of December 2020, more than half of the students were physically present in Germany. All the students attended classes together – either online if they were still in their home countries or in classrooms at the Geilenkirchen campus. Entrance exams were offered regularly online, thus giving more applicants from all over the world the opportunity to join the Freshman Institute.

2019

• The Freshman Institute offers now two new study courses "Rail Vehicle Engineering" and "Optometry" with guaranteed study places.

2018

• The Freshman Program in Kenitra, Morocco opens
• New director as of 1 September 2018: Prof. Dr.-Ing. Josef Hodapp
• The campus Bedburg-Hau is closed

2017

• Freshman applicants from China, Vietnam, and Mongolia can apply for a visa directly at their consulates without APS, as long as they continue their studies at a university in North Rhine-Westphalia after completion of the Freshman Program

2015

• 500 students from 30 countries are enrolled in the Freshman Program in the winter semester of 2015

2014

• Due to limited capacity at the Geilenkirchen and Bedburg-Hau campuses, 40 students live and study in Aachen

2013

• Linnich campus is closed
• New student housing is built on the Geilenkirchen campus

2012

• Campus Bedburg-Hau opens with 85 students

2010

• The Geilenkirchen campus expands to include programs in business, humanities, and medicine
• The Forschungszentrum Jülich (Research Centre Jülich) offers the first internships for Freshmen
• 285 students

2009

• 240 students
• 45 students live and learn in Geilenkirchen at Loherhof and, for the first time, students are prepared to study business
• The Rhine-Waal University of Applied Sciences becomes a partner institution
• 40 state scholarships are granted for the first time

2008

• 190 students from China, India, Indonesia, and Iran
• Partner universities expanded to include the University Duisburg-Essen (50% in English and 50% in German for all ISE bachelor programs) and the Fachhochschule Südwestfalen (100% in English).

2007

• Establishment of the Freshman Institute as a central organization of the FH Aachen
• Director: Professor Herman-Josef Buchkremer
• 130 students, mostly from China, Azerbaijan, and Turkey

2006

• Approved by the "Akademische Prüfstelle" (APS), 60 students, of which 44 are Chinese
• FH Aachen/Freshman Institute offers its own entrance exam in the home countries of prospective students
• Students live and learn on the Linnich Campus.

2005

• Establishment of the Freshman Program as a model project through the North Rhine-Westphalia (NRW) Department of Education

2002

• Decrease in the number of students after the establishment of the "Akademische Prüfstelle" (APS) at the German embassy in Beijing and the outbreak of the SARS epidemic

2001

• Project Director: Professor Herman-Josef Buchkremer, Rector of the FH Aachen
• The first complete Freshman Program under the provisional management of the AcIAS (Aachen Institute of Applied Sciences e.V.) with 30 students from China

== Institutes ==
Institutes are scientific institutions of the university. They bundle competencies to carry out intensive research and development. This takes place in cooperation with institutes of other universities in Germany and abroad, with research institutions and frequently with industry. The FH Aachen currently has the following institutes:

- Institute of Building Materials and Construction
- I.F.I. institute for industrial aerodynamics GmbH, institute at the Aachen University of Applied Sciences
- 3win-IfiM – Institute of Innovative Mechanical Engineering, institute at the Aachen University of Applied Sciences
- Institute for Thermoprocess Technology GmbH, institute at the Aachen University of Applied Sciences

Campus Jülich

- IAP - Institute of Applied Polymer Chemistry, based at the Aachen University of Applied Sciences in Jülich.
- Institute of Bioengineering
- Institute of Nano- and Biotechnologies
- Institute NOWUM-Energy
- Solar-Institute Jülich

== Rectors ==
- 1971-1984: Helmut Strehl
- 1984-1987: Hildegard Reitz
- 1987-1991: René Flosdorff
- 1991-2005: Josef Buchkremer
- 2005-2009: Manfred Schulte-Zurhausen
- 2009-2021: Marcus Baumann
- from 2021: Bernd Pietschmann

== Gallery ==
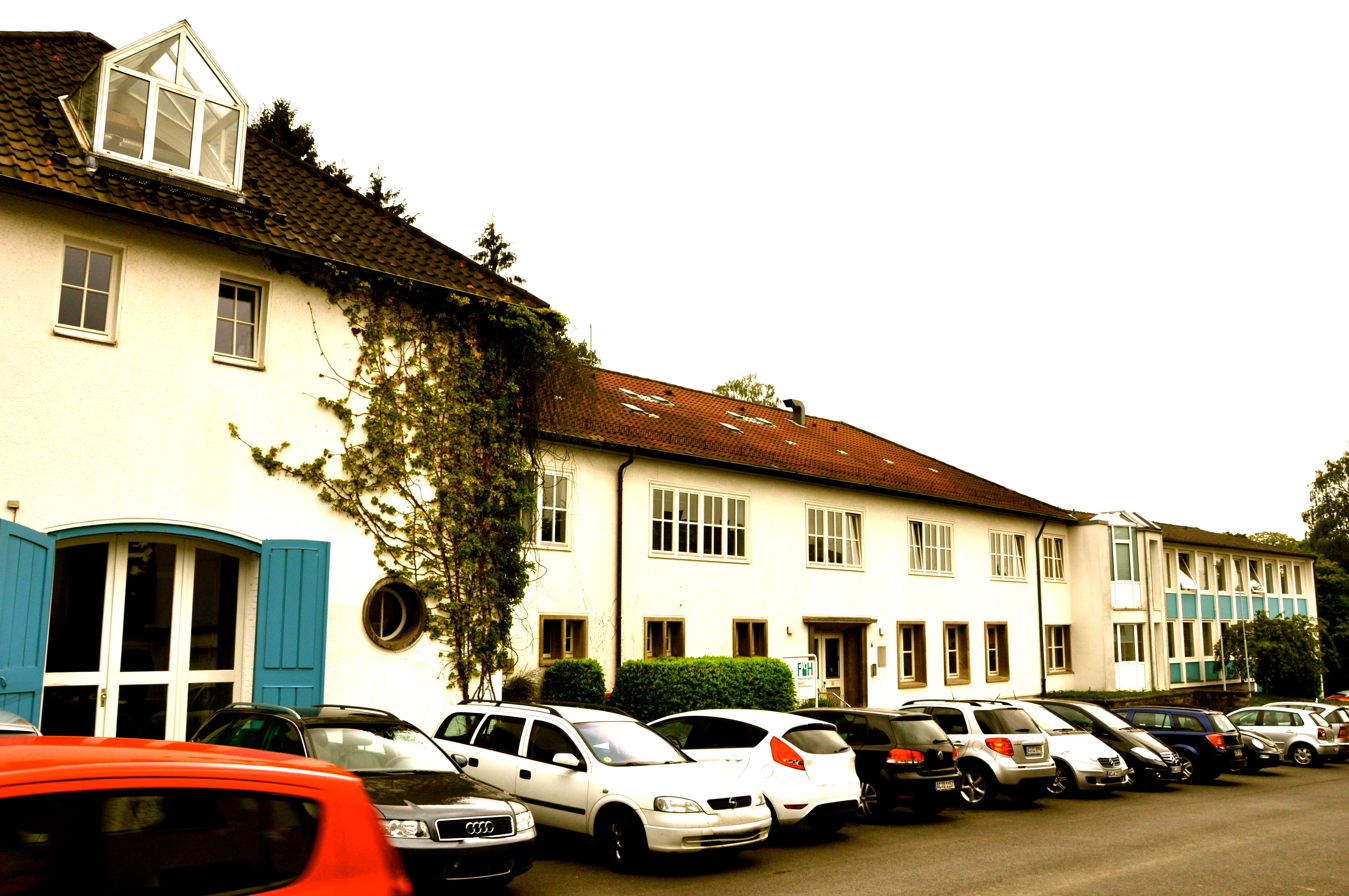
Administration

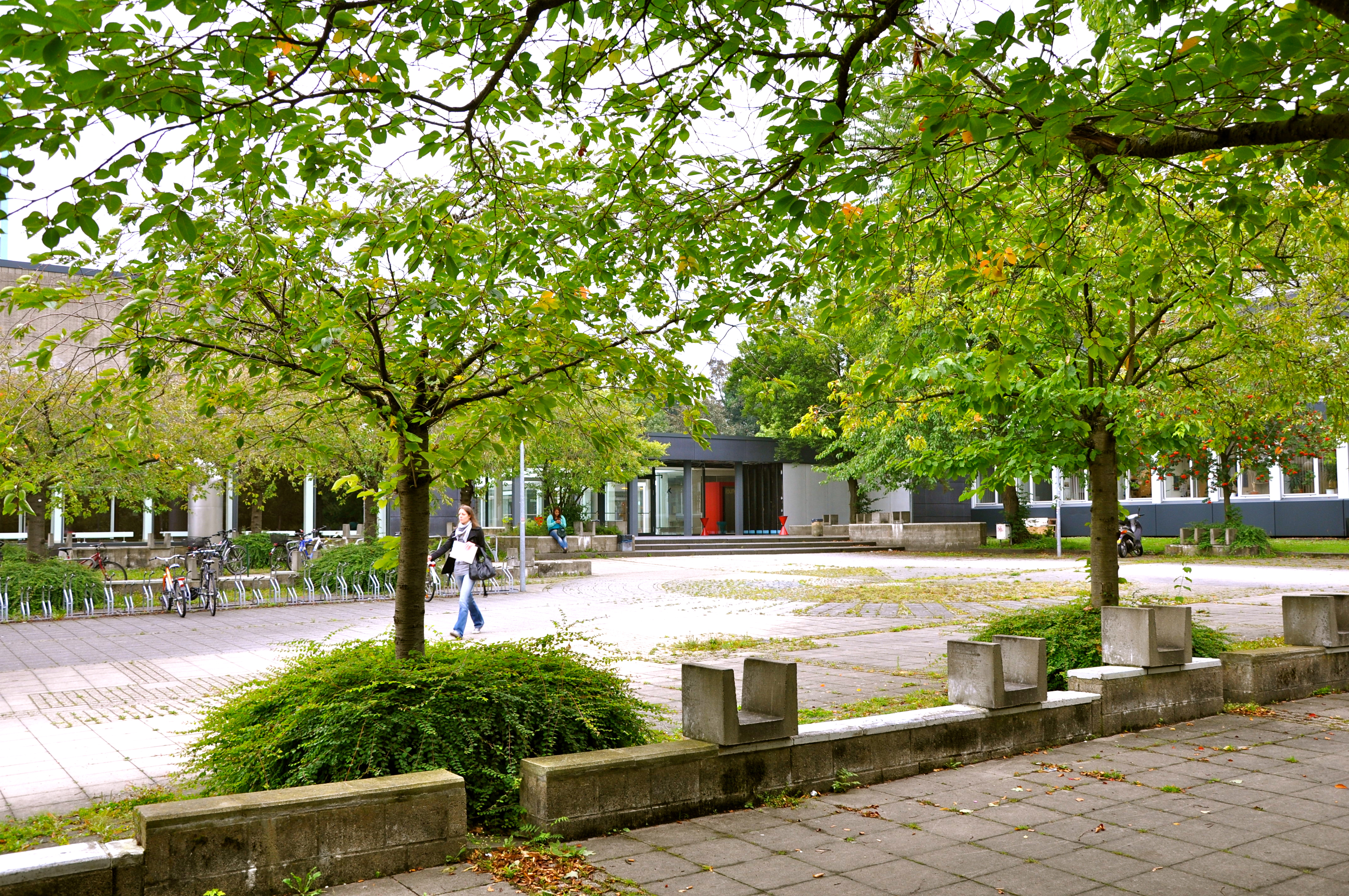
Campus Bayernallee

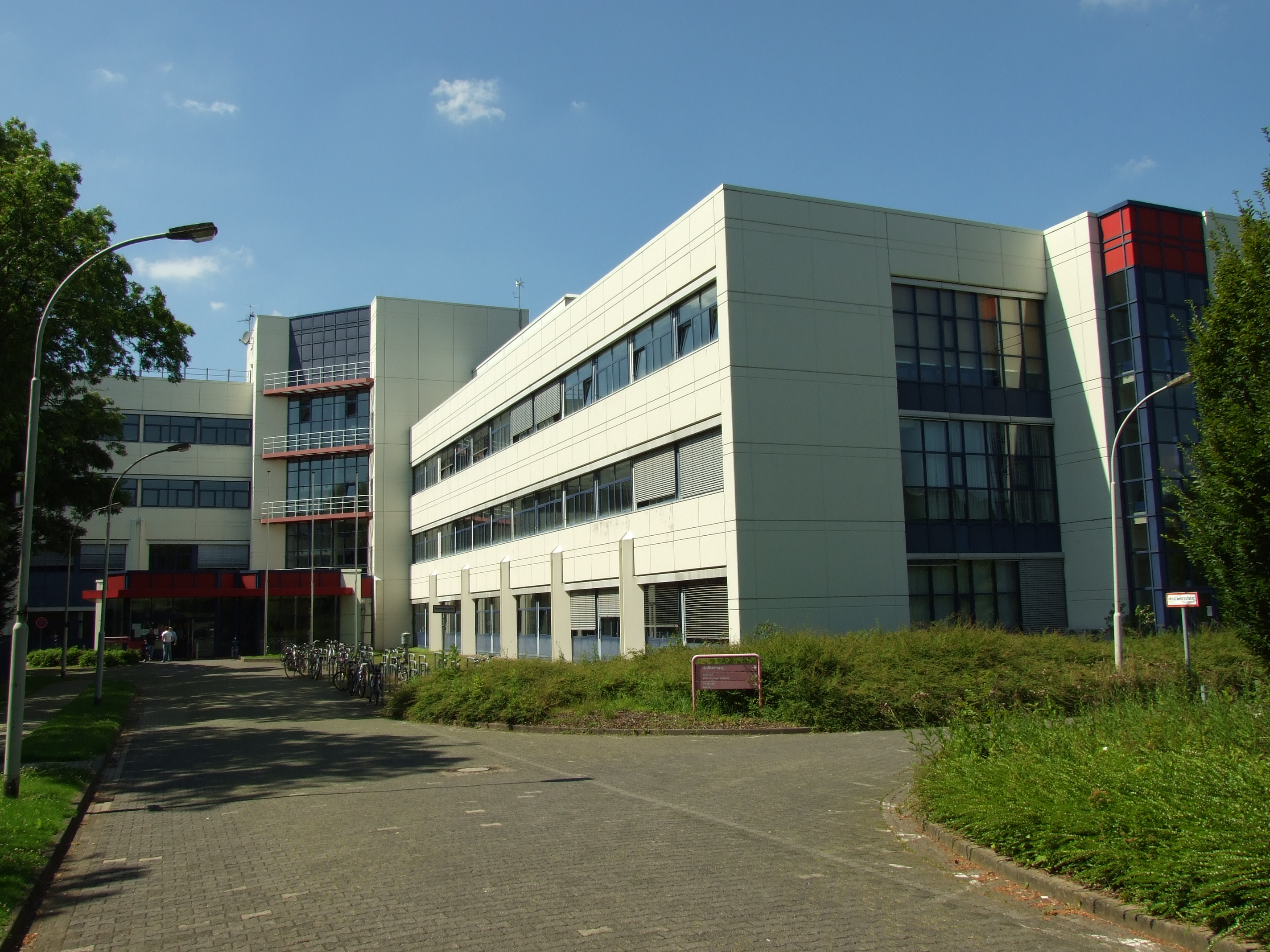
Campus Eupener Straße

Campus Goethestraße

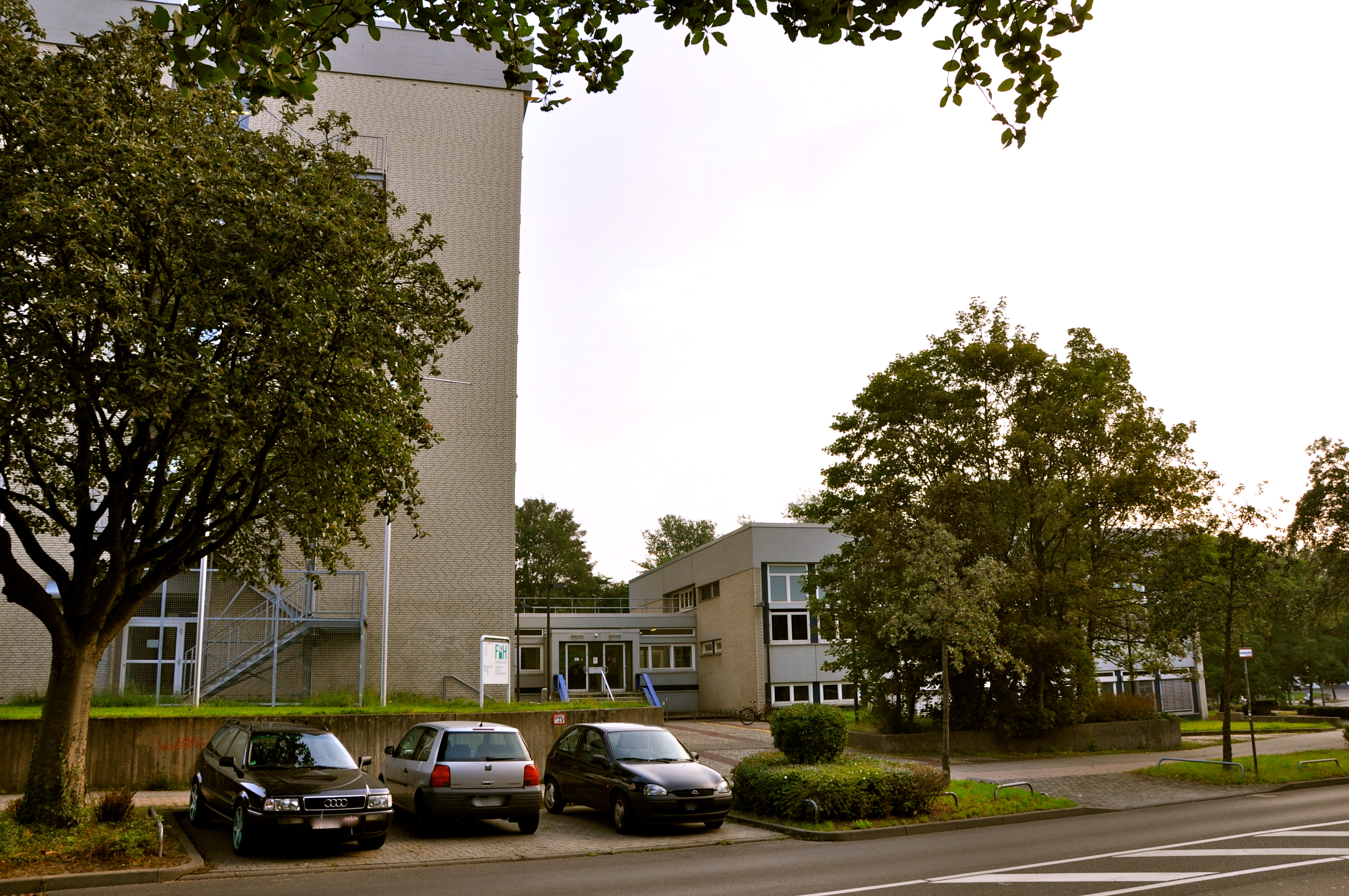
Campus Hohenstaufenallee
