= American Solar Challenge =

Solar car race

American Solar Challenge
- Venue: Public Roads
- Location: Varies
- Corporate sponsor: Innovators Educational Foundation
- First race: 1990; 36 years ago
- Last race: 2026; 0 years ago
- Distance: Varies
- Duration: 8 days
- Previous names: North American Solar Challenge, Sunrayce
- Most wins (team): University of Michigan

The American Solar Challenge (ASC), previously known as the North American Solar Challenge and Sunrayce, is a solar car race across the United States. In the race, teams from colleges and universities throughout North America design, build, test, and race solar-powered vehicles in a long distance road rally-style event. ASC is a test of teamwork, engineering skill, and endurance that stretches across thousands of miles of public roads.

The competition occurs every two years in the summer of even years. ASC 2020 was postponed until 2021 due to the COVID-19 pandemic.

== Format and organization ==
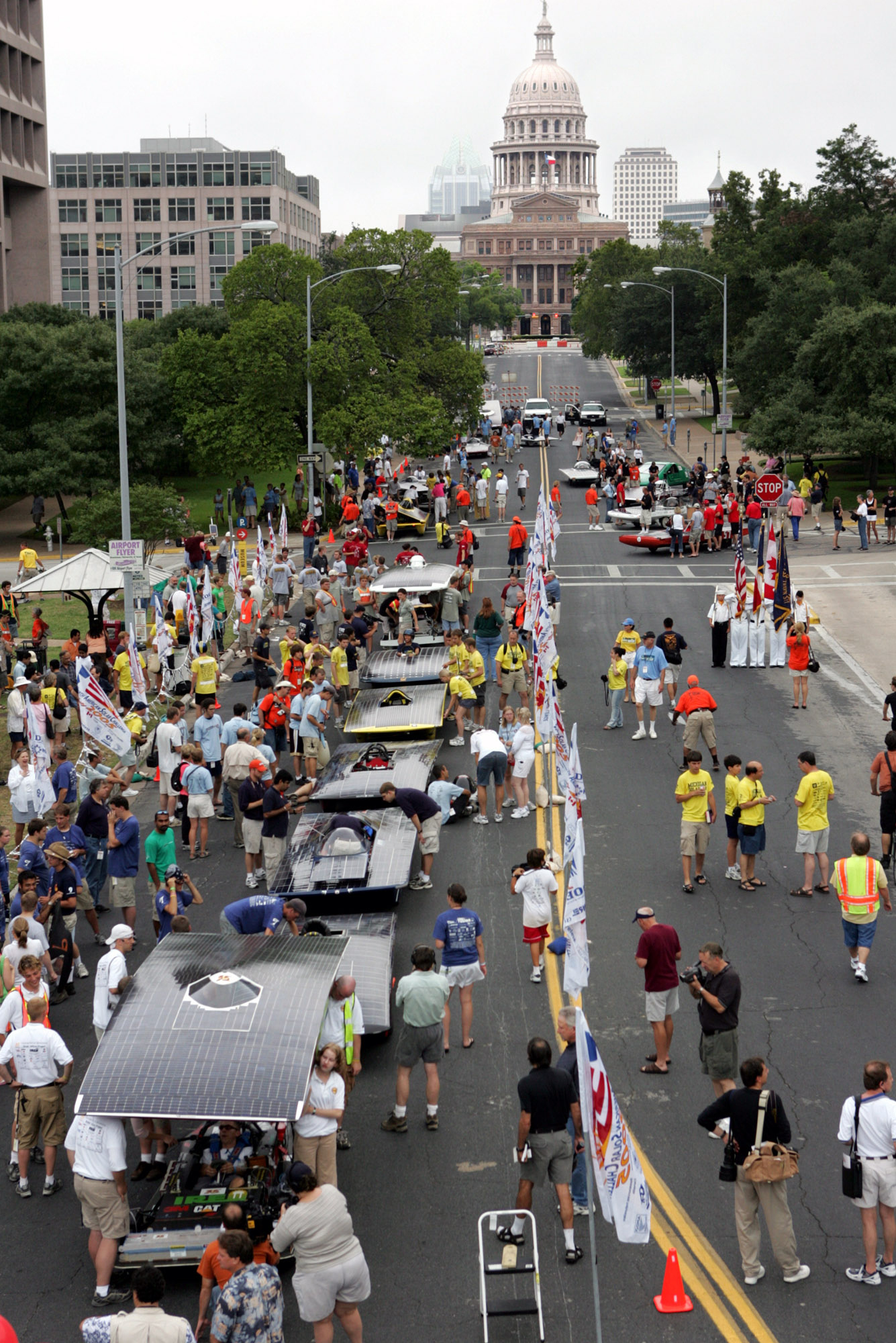
Solar race cars and crews at the start of the 2005 race in Austin, Texas. Photo: Stefano Paltera/North American Solar Challenge.

=== Rules ===
- Race consists of a series of timed stages between predetermined locations; all teams begin and end each stage in the same location
- The team with the lowest overall elapsed time wins
- The total area of all solar cells and related reflectors, etc. must not exceed 6 square meters
- When the vehicle has stopped, the solar array may be reoriented toward the sun for charging batteries
- Strict specifications and engineering scrutiny process is provided for vehicle configuration, safety requirements, and other standards
- Previous races have divided teams into open and stock classes based on levels of solar cell and battery technologies.
- The Formula Sun Grand Prix track race serves as a qualifier for the more prestigious ASC.

== History ==
Originally called Sunrayce USA, the first race was organized and sponsored by General Motors in 1990 in an effort to promote automotive engineering and solar energy among college students. At the time, GM had just won the inaugural World Solar Challenge in Australia in 1987; rather than continue actively racing, it instead opted to sponsor collegiate events.

Subsequent races were held in 1993, 1995, 1997 and 1999 under the name Sunrayce [year] (e.g. Sunrayce 93) In 2001, the race was renamed American Solar Challenge and was sponsored by the United States Department of Energy and the National Renewable Energy Laboratory. Beginning in 2005, its name changed again to North American Solar Challenge, in order to reflect the border crossing into Canada and the addition of co-sponsor Natural Resources Canada. The name was changed back to ASC in 2010.

After the 2005 race, the U.S. Department of Energy discontinued its sponsorship, resulting in no scheduled race for 2007. Sponsorship was taken over for NASC 2008 by Toyota. The American Solar Challenge is now governed by the Innovators Educational Foundation.

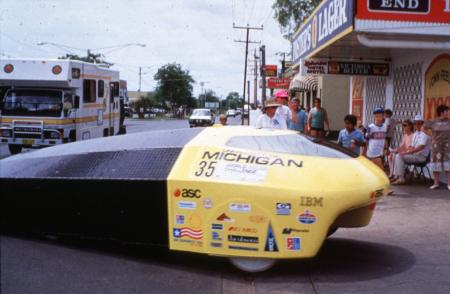
University of Michigan's Sunrunner, winner of the inaugural Sunrayce USA in 1990.

=== 1990 ===
The original, 1,800 mi (2,900 km) Sunrayce USA route started at Disney World in Orlando, Florida and ended at the General Motors Technical Center in Warren, Michigan. The winner of the first race was the University of Michigan Solar Car Team's Sunrunner, with an average speed of 24.7 mph (39.8 km/h), followed by Western Washington University's Viking XX.

Overall Standings

=== 1993 ===
Sunrayce 93 was held June 20–26, 1993. The race route covered over 1,100 miles (1,800 km) starting in Arlington, TX and ending in Minneapolis, Minnesota. The first place car was Maize & Blue from the University of Michigan followed by the Intrepid from Cal Poly Pomona.

Overall Standings

=== 1995 ===
Sunrayce 95 ran along a 1,600-mile (2,600 km) route from Indianapolis, Indiana to Golden, Colorado. Massachusetts Institute of Technology's Manta won the race with an average speed of 37.23 mph (59.92 km/h), followed by the University of Minnesota's Aurora II just 18 minutes behind.

Overall Standings

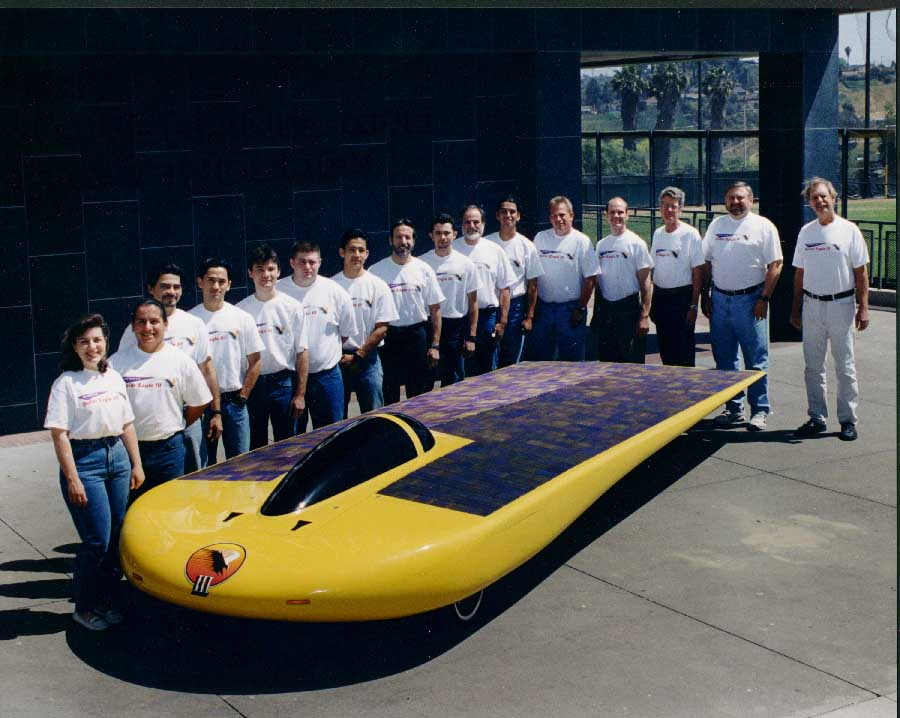
Cal State LA's Solar Eagle III, winner of Sunrayce USA in 1997.

=== 1997 ===
Sunrayce 1997 followed a familiar route from Indianapolis, Indiana to a finish line in Colorado Springs, Colorado. California State University-Los Angeles's Solar Eagle III won the nine-day Sunrayce 97. Solar Eagle III averaged 43.29 mph (69.67 km/h), followed by MIT's Manta GT in second place.

Overall Standings

=== 1999 ===
Sunrayce 99, running from Washington, D.C., to Orlando, Florida, was notable for its lack of sunshine. The University of Missouri-Rolla's Solar Miner II won the race with an average speed of 25.3 mph (40.7 km/h). The car from Queen's University placed second.

Overall Standings

=== 2001 ===
In 2001, the race changed its name to the American Solar Challenge and followed a new route from Chicago, Illinois to Claremont, California along much of the old U.S. Route 66. The University of Michigan won the overall race and the Open Class with a total elapsed time of 56 hours, 10 minutes, and 46 seconds, followed by the University of Missouri-Rolla. The University of Arizona team won the Stock Class event.

Overall Standings

=== 2003 ===
The 2003 American Solar Challenge also followed U.S. Route 66. Solar Miner IV from the University of Missouri-Rolla won the race overall, as well as the Open Class, followed by the University of Minnesota's Borealis II. The Stock Class was won by the Prairie Fire GT from North Dakota State University.

Overall Standings

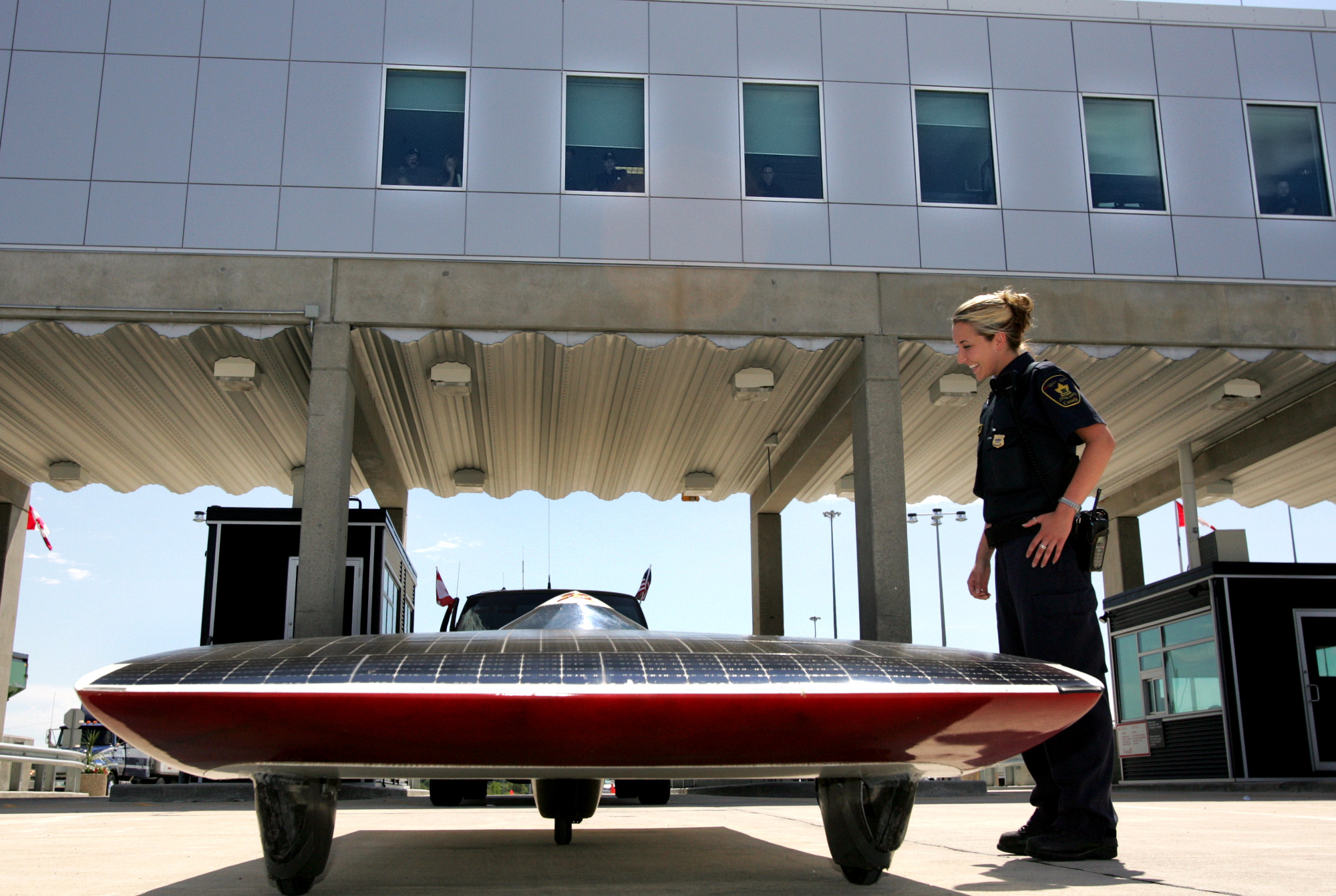
Minnesota's Borealis III crosses the border to Canada on July 21, 2005.

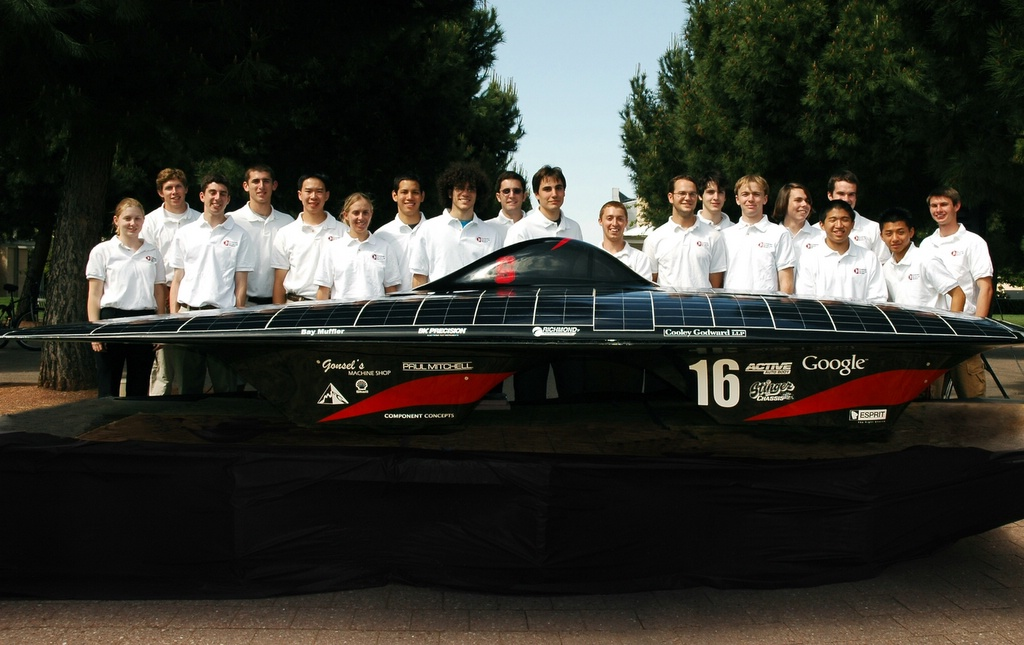
Stanford's Solstice team in 2005.

=== 2005 ===
The 2005 race, renamed the North American Solar Challenge, was both the longest and most hotly contested race in the history of the event. The route covered 2,494.9 mi (4,015.2 km), taking the teams from Austin, Texas in the United States to Calgary, Alberta in Canada. The race was won by the Momentum from the University of Michigan with an average speed of 46.2 mph (74.4 km/h). The University of Minnesota's Borealis III followed in second place less than 12 minutes behind, with an average speed of 46.0 mph (74.0 km/h). The lead teams often drove 65 mph (105 km/h) (the maximum allowed), but were slowed by rain in Kansas and 20 mph (32 km/h) headwinds in Canada. Stanford University's Solstice won the Stock Class, followed in second place by the Beam Machine from The University of California, Berkeley.

Overall Standings

Michigan's Continuum wins NASC 2008.

=== 2008 ===
The 2008 North American Solar Challenge took place on July 13–22, 2008, mostly along the 2005 route from Dallas, Texas to Calgary, Alberta. The University of Michigan's Continuum won the race with a total elapsed time of 51 hours, 41 minutes, and 53 seconds, marking that school's fifth victory. Ra 7 from Principia College followed in second place.

As many of the top cars were bumping up against the 65 mph (105 km/h) race speed limit in the 2005 event, race rules were changed for 2008 order to improve safety and limit performance. Open class cars are now only allowed 6 square meters of active cell area, and upright seating is required for both open and stock class cars. The changes were carried over from the 2007 World Solar Challenge.

Overall Standings

=== 2010 ===
The 2010 race, renamed the American Solar Challenge, ran June 20–26, 2010. The University of Michigan finished in first place, followed by the University of Minnesota's Centaurus II in 2nd place and team Bochum from Germany in 3rd. The race route was entirely within the United States for the first time since 2003.

Overall Standings

=== 2012 ===
Only four teams finished the 2012 American Solar Challenge, a 1600-mile race from Rochester, NY to St. Paul, MN, under solar power alone. The University of Michigan's Quantum won the overall competition, over 10 hours ahead of the 2nd place team. The 2nd, 3rd, and 4th place teams were only an hour apart from each other. In order: Iowa State University's Hyperion, Principia College's Ra7s, and the University of California, Berkeley's Impulse.

Overall Standings

=== 2014 ===
The 2014 American Solar Challenge reverted to the familiar south–north race route starting in Austin, Texas, and finishing in Minneapolis, Minnesota. The University of Michigan's Quantum once again took 1st place, followed by University of Minnesota's Centaurus III. Both teams had brought back their cars from the 2012 event.

Overall Standings

=== 2016 ===
The 2016 American Solar Challenge ran from Brecksville, Ohio to Hot Springs, South Dakota from July 30 to August 6, 2016. ASC partnered with the National Park Service, and the route included stages and checkpoints at 9 national parks, historic sites, or partner properties throughout the Midwest. The University of Michigan's Aurum won the overall competition, by a margin of over 11 hours. In second place was the Dunwoody College of Technology team in partnership with Zurich University of Applied Sciences. The University of Minnesota's Eos I made history as the first Cruiser Class vehicle to ever compete in ASC.

Overall Standings

=== 2018 ===
The 2018 American Solar Challenge ran from Omaha, Nebraska to Bend, Oregon from July 14 to July 22, 2018. ASC partnered with the National Park Service, and the route included stages and checkpoints at historic sights along the Oregon Trail. It was the first to include a Cruiser Class, featuring more practical multi-occupant Solar Vehicles. Western Sydney University's car UNLIMITED 2.0 won the Challenger class competition by a margin of 16 minutes—the closest finish in ASC history—as The University of Michigan failed to defend their title with their car Novum. The University of Bologna won the inaugural Cruiser class competition, and the University of Waterloo became the first Canadian Cruiser Class vehicle to ever compete in ASC.

=== 2020 ===
The 2020 American Solar Challenge was postponed due to the COVID-19 pandemic. It was held in 2021, with the starting point at Independence, Missouri and the end point at Las Vegas, New Mexico from August 4 to August 7. The team from the Massachusetts Institute of Technology took first place in the single-occupant class with Nimbus, with approximately 143 miles more in distance covered compared to second place, held by the University of Kentucky team. Appalachian State took first place in the multi-occupant vehicle class.

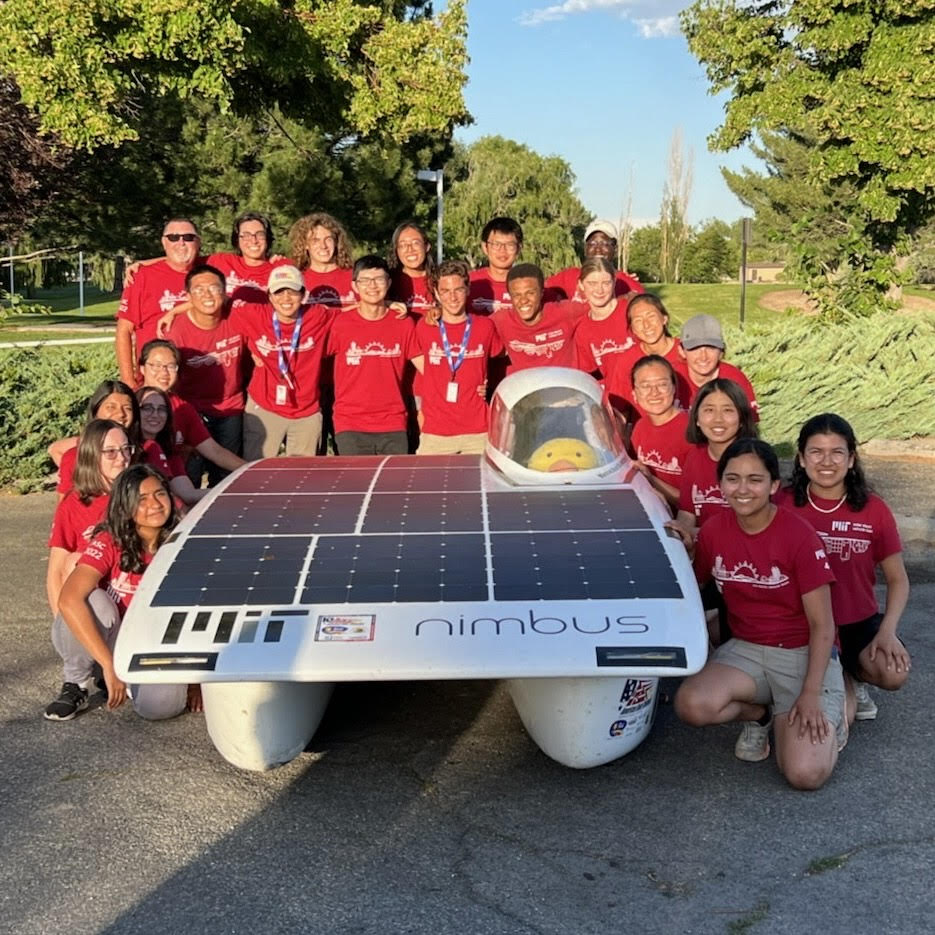
MIT posing with their back-to-back champion vehicle Nimbus.

=== 2022 ===
The 2022 American Solar Challenge ran from Independence, Missouri to Twin Falls, Idaho from July 9 to July 16, 2022. Similar to the 2018 race, ASC partnered with the National Park Service, and the route traversed through historic sites and landmarks along the Oregon Trail. The team from the Massachusetts Institute of Technology took first place in the single-occupant class with their champion vehicle from the previous race, Nimbus. They finished the race with just over 73 miles more than second place finisher Principia College. The winner of the Cruiser class was the University of Minnesota, with Appalachian State University coming in second place.

=== 2024 ===
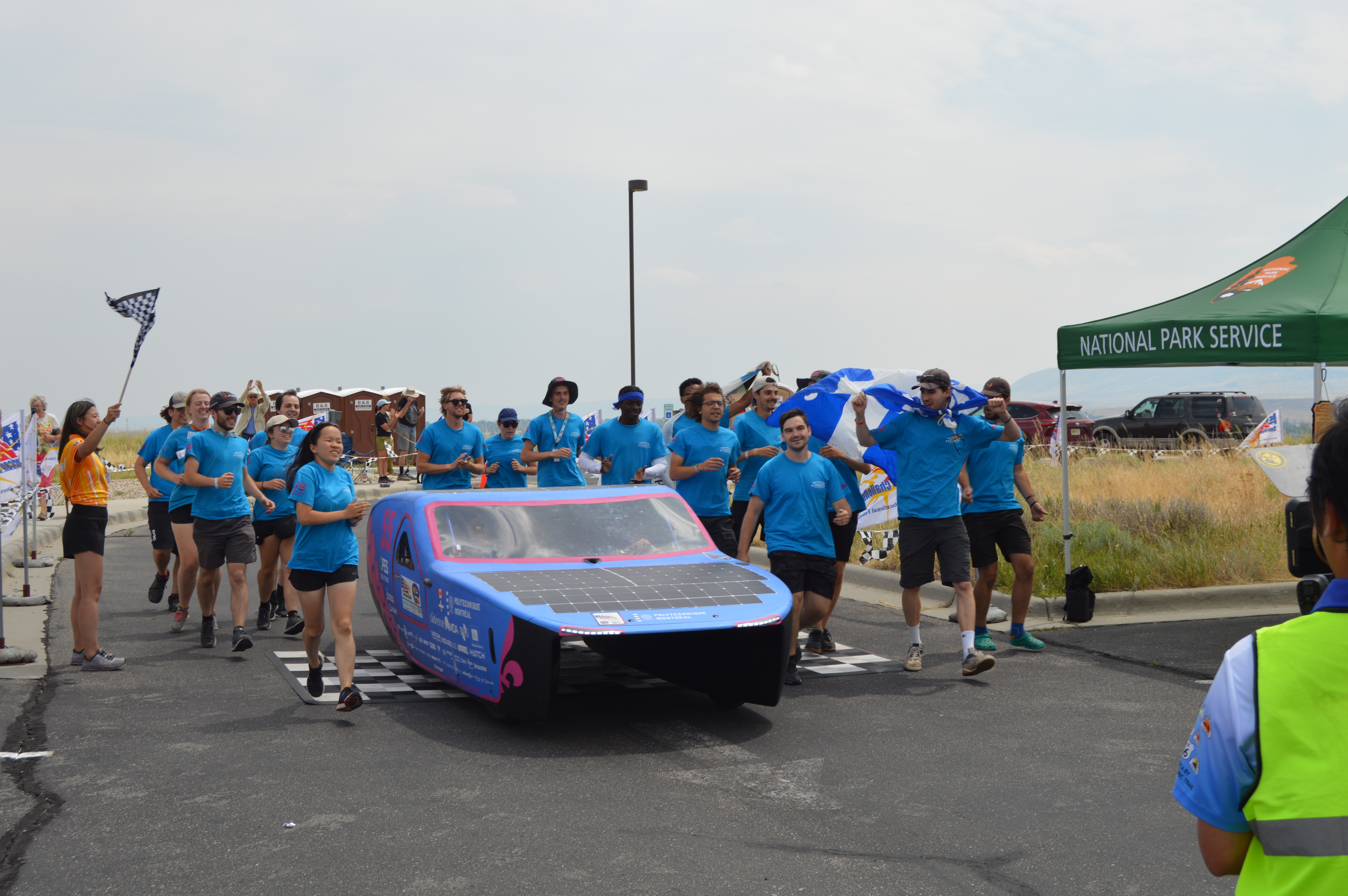
Poly Montreal Crossing the ASC 2024 Finish Line

The Electrek American Solar Challenge 2024 ran from Nashville, Tennessee to Casper, Wyoming from July 20 to July 27, 2024. Similar to the previous competitions, ASC partnered with the National Park Service this time following several National Historic Trails and finishing at the National Historic Trails Interpretive Center.

The Single Occupant Vehicle Class was won by the University of Michigan Solar Car Team with 2095.5 miles traveled during the event while the Multi-Occupant Vehicle Class was won by the team from Polytechnique Montréal with a score of 73.86.

=== 2026 ===
The Elektrek American Solar Challenge 2026 ran from Minneapolis, Minnesota to Amarillo, Texas from July 25 to August 1, 2026.

The single-occupant vehicle class was won by Innoptus Solar Team from KU Leuven with 2671.2 miles traveled during the event. The multi-occupant vehicle class was won by Team Sunergy from Appalachian State University with a score of 92.717.

== See also ==
- Solar car racing
- List of solar car teams
- List of prototype solar-powered cars

=== Other solar vehicle challenges ===
- Formula Sun Grand Prix
- South African Solar Challenge, a biennial South African event that was first held in 2008
- The Solar Car Challenge, an annual event for High School students from the U.S. and (to a lesser extent) other parts of the world, first held in 1995
- World Solar Challenge, the biennial World Championship solar car race held in Australia
