= 2006 World Solar Rally in Taiwan =

Solar vehicle race

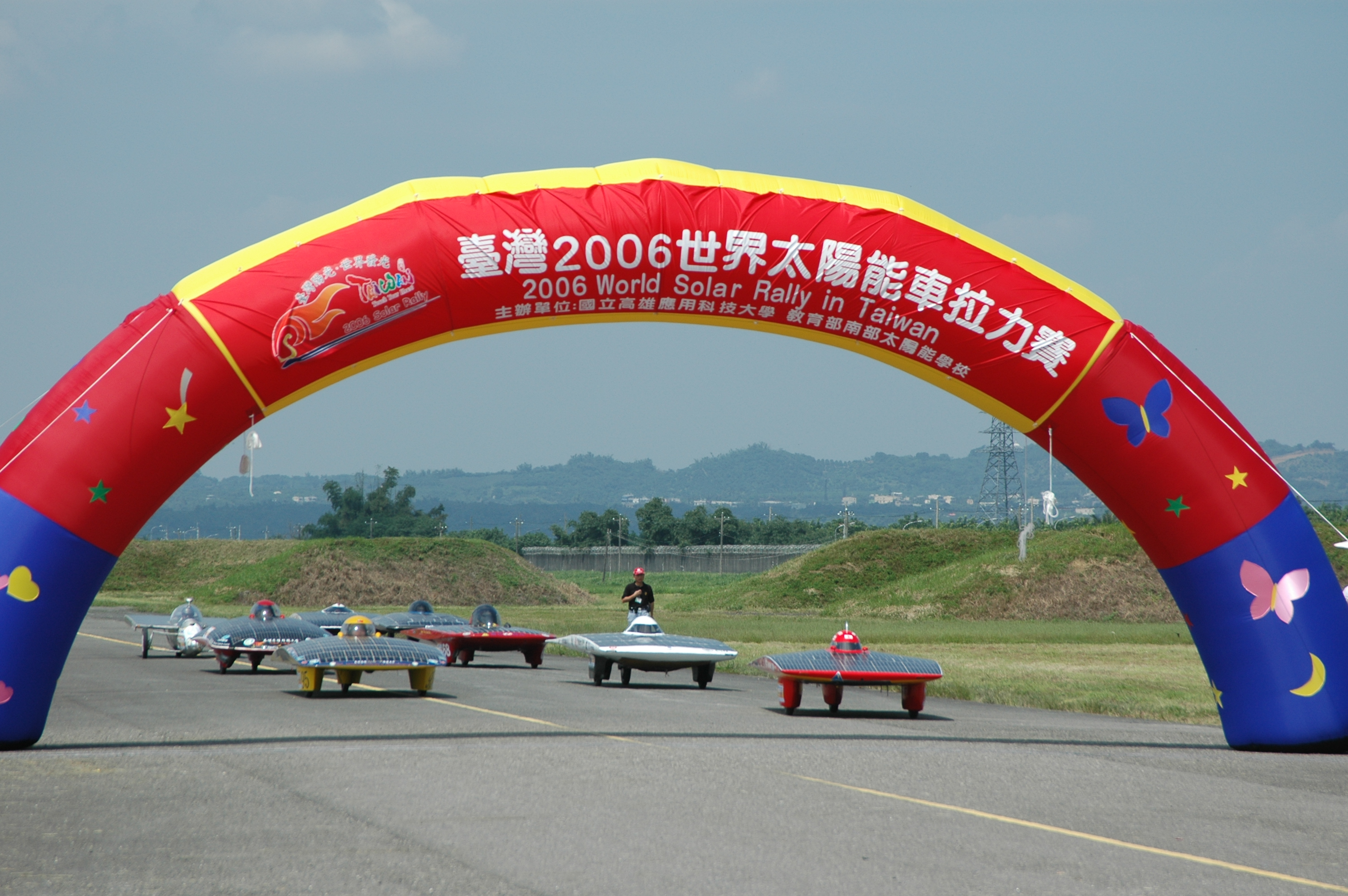
2006 World Solar Rally in Taiwan (Circuit Race).

The 2006 World Solar Rally in Taiwan was a solar vehicle auto race held in September 2006 in Taiwan. Ten teams from five countries, most university-based, competed in a series of races around the island for the trophy.

== Race ==
The race was preceded by a parade on September 16 through the city of Kaohsiung, followed by a circuit race at Pingtung Airport on September 17, with the actual rally taking place in three stages on the following three days. The total race was about 570 km (350 mi) long. Most of the race consisted of untimed transit stages, while the eight timed sections totaled up to about 44 km (27 mi) long.

The route went past landmarks and cultural destinations including the Shueishang Tropic of Cancer Park in Chiayi County, Lugang Mazu Temple in Changhua County, Da-Jai as Jenlan Temple in Taichung, Chulu Pasture in Taitung, and Fong Kong in Pintong.

The terrain on all three days of the rally was very diverse. Most of the first day was on gently curving two-lane roads, and was generally uphill. The first day concluded with a very steep hill climb. The second day's timed stages were on roller-coaster-like four-lane highways, while the third and last day's route was on flat, straight highway. Each day presented its own unique challenges for planning strategy.

== Results ==
The awards ceremony was held on 21 September.

The top three from the circuit race at Pingtung Airport were Sky Ace TIGA from Ashiya University in Ashiya, Japan, Apollo V from the National Kaohsiung University of Applied Sciences in Taiwan, and Tokai Falcon from Tokai University in Japan.

Six teams placed in the rally; the other five did not complete all of the rally and thus could not place. First place went to Ashiya University from Ashiya, Japan. Second place was Apollo V from the National Kaohsiung University of Applied Sciences; third place was the team from Southern Taiwan University of Technology.

== Teams ==
Ten teams competed in the event. The National Kaohsiung University of Applied Sciences, who hosted the event, fielded two cars, bringing the total number of cars to eleven. A twelfth car, the #101 from Aurora Vehicle Association in Australia, entered the event but was not able to attend. They were forced to withdraw after their car was destroyed in an accident at the Tour del Sol in France in June.

| Team | Vehicle | Country | Ranking |
|---|---|---|---|
| Ashiya University | Sky Ace TIGA | Japan | 1 |
| Univ. of Applied Sciences | Apollo V | Taiwan | 2 |
| Southern Univ. of Tech. | Phoenix | Taiwan | 3 |
| University of Minnesota | Borealis III | USA | 4 |
| Univ. of Applied Sciences | Apollo Plus | Taiwan | 5 |
| Tokai University | Tokai Falcon | Japan | 6 |
| Middle East Tech. Univ. | Ekinoks | Turkey | Did not Complete |
| Principia College | Ra 6 | USA | Did not Complete |
| KAMM Solar Car Team | KAMM | Germany | Did not Complete |
| HelioDet Solar Car Team | Heliodet 6 | Germany | Did not Complete |
| University of Tehran | Persian Gazelle | Iran | Did not Complete |
