= Formula Sun Grand Prix 2012 =

FSGP 2012 was held at the Monticello Motor Club in Monticello, New York, and served as a qualifier for the 2012 American Solar Challenge. It was won by the University of Michigan.

| Rank | Team | Day 1 Laps | Day 2 Laps | Day 3 Laps | Penalty Laps | Total Laps |
|---|---|---|---|---|---|---|
| 1 | University of Michigan | 145 | 158 | 146 | | 449 |
| 2 | Iowa State University | 125 | 146 | 155 | | 426 |
| 3 | Western Michigan University | 120 | 119 | 127 | | 366 |
| 4 | Illinois State University | 88 | 131 | 131 | | 350 |
| 5 | Oregon State University | 84 | 80 | 19 | 2 | 181 |
| 6 | University of Minnesota | 109 | 0 | 71 | | 180 |
| 7 | Principia College | 103 | 58 | 0 | 10 | 151 |
| 8 | Polytechnique Montreal | 76 | 28 | 109 | | 137 |
| 9 | UC Berkeley | 0 | 110 | 0 | | 110 |
| 10 | Massachusetts Institute of Technology | 0 | 55 | 107 | | 107 |
| 11 | SUNY - New Paltz | 0 | 66 | 94 | 2 | 92 |
| 12 | Michigan State University | 0 | 0 | 50 | | 50 |
| 13 | University of New Mexico | 22 | 0 | 0 | | 22 |
| 14 | University of Kentucky | 0 | 0 | 6 | | 6 |
