= American Solar Challenge 2010 =

The 2010 American Solar Challenge (ASC) was an intercollegiate solar car race on June 20–26, 2010. The event was won by the University of Michigan. It was the 10th American national championship solar car race held.

== Route ==
- Day 1: Sun, June 20: Start in Broken Arrow, Oklahoma; must reach Neosho, Missouri checkpoint.
- Day 2: Mon, June 21: Finish in Topeka, Kansas.
- Day 3: Tue, June 22: Start in Topeka, KS; must reach Jefferson City, MO checkpoint.
- Day 4: Wed, June 23: Finish in Rolla, MO.
- Day 5: Thu, June 24: Start in Rolla, MO; must reach Alton, Illinois checkpoint.
- Day 6: Fri, June 25: Finish in Normal, IL.
- Day 7: Sat, June 26: Start in Normal, IL; finish in Naperville, IL

== Results ==
=== Overall ===
Rank	Team Name	Total Time
1	University of Michigan	28:14:44
2	University of Minnesota	30:26:53
3	Hochschule Bochum	30:34:50
4	Stanford University	31:59:44
5	Missouri S&T	32:53:56
6	University of Calgary	33:35:26
7	National Kaohsiung University of Applied Sciences	36:25:00
8	SUNY New Paltz	47:10:30
9	University of Kentucky	47:11:27
10	Northwestern University	53:52:39
11	Iowa State University	67:29:55
12	University of Texas	68:56:32
13	Illinois State University	70:09:19
	Western Michigan University	Did not start
	Oregon State University	DNQ
	University of New Mexico	DNQ

=== Stage 1 ===
Team # and Name	Start, Tulsu (6/20)	Checkpoint, Neosho (6/20)	Finish, Topeka (6/21)	Penalties	Stage Time
2 – Michigan	12:00:00	14:38:00	11:25:03	00:00:00	7:25:03
35 – Minnesota	12:02:00	14:51:00	11:50:40	00:00:00	7:48:40
10 – Bochum	12:01:00	14:49:15	12:05:21	00:00:00	8:05:21
65 – Calgary	12:05:00	15:13:24	12:41:34	00:00:00	8:36:34
42 – Missouri S&T	12:07:00	15:38:55	13:21:15	00:00:00	9:21:15
16 – Stanford	12:10:00	15:49:46	13:50:40	00:10:00	9:50:40
95 – Kaohsiung	12:04:00	14:59:49	14:31:01	00:01:30	10:28:31
28 – New Paltz	12:06:00	15:24:30	15:44:56	00:01:30	11:46:26
11 – Northwestern	12:03:00	16:33:18	17:22:40	00:16:00	13:35:40
3 – Kentucky*	12:10:00	16:18:20	16:30:34	02:07:30	14:28:04
88 – Texas Austin	12:08:00	-	-	04:19:03	19:19:03
9 – Iowa State	12:09:00	-	-	05:26:15	20:26:15
5 – Illinois State	12:08:00	-	-	17:57:36	32:57:36
20 – Western Michigan*	12:13:00	-	-	17:57:36	32:57:36

* teams with conditional qualifying status

=== Stage 2 ===
Team # and Name	Start, Topeka (6/22)	Checkpoint, Jefferson City (6/22)	Finish, Rolla (6/23)	Penalties	Stage Time	Total Elapsed
2 – Michigan	9:00:00	13:53:05	10:23:16	00:12:00	8:35:16	16:00:19
35 – Minnesota	9:01:00	14:25:11	11:18:22	00:00:00	9:18:22	17:07:02
10 – Bochum	9:02:00	14:18:03	11:25:10	00:08:00	9:33:10	17:38:31
65 – Calgary	9:03:00	14:56:32	12:35:10	00:00:00	10:35:10	19:11:44
16 – Stanford	9:05:00	14:46:10	11:37:42	00:10:00	9:47:42	19:38:22
42 – Missouri S&T	9:04:00	14:40:50	12:30:29	00:00:00	10:30:29	19:51:44
95 – Kaohsiung	9:05:00	15:29:16	13:38:57	00:00:00	11:33:57	22:02:28
28 – New Paltz	9:06:00	-	15:48:28	00:04:00	15:46:28	27:32:54
11 – Northwestern	9:08:00	-	16:16:12	00:16:00	16:24:12	29:59:52
3 – Kentucky	9:07:00	-	15:46:36	00:02:00	15:41:36	30:05:10
88 – Texas Austin	9:10:00	-	-	7:13:30	24:13:30	43:32:33
9 – Iowa State	9:11:00	-	-	11:21:00	28:21:00	48:47:15
5 – Illinois State	9:12:00	-	-	00:16:00	17:16:00	50:13:36

=== Stage 3 ===
Team # and Name	Start, Rolla (6/24)	Checkpoint, Alton (6/24)	Finish, Normal (6/25)	Penalties	Stage Time	Total Elapsed
2 – Michigan	9:00:00	13:27:49	10:15:05	00:05:00	9:20:08	25:20:27
35 – Minnesota	9:01:00	13:29:00	11:22:26	00:07:00	10:29:26	27:36:28
10 – Bochum	9:02:00	13:53:53	11:02:40	00:08:00	10:10:40	27:49:11
16 – Stanford	9:03:00	13:34:31	10:21:43	00:12:00	9:33:43	29:12:05
42 – Missouri S&T	9:04:00	13:48:08	10:56:43	00:04:00	10:00:43	29:52:27
65 – Calgary	9:02:00	14:28:58	12:14:55	00:06:00	11:20:55	30:32:39
95 – Kaohsiung	9:06:00	14:07:20	11:51:54	00:13:00	11:04:54	33:07:22
3 – Kentucky	9:07:00	14:51:41	12:57:59	00:02:00	11:59:59	42:05:39
28 – New Paltz	9:05:00	-	15:09:52	00:02:00	15:11:52	42:44:46
11 – Northwestern	9:06:00	-	-	03:29:00	19:29:00	49:28:52
9 – Iowa State	9:09:00	-	15:24:27	00:06:00	15:30:27	64:17:42
88 – Texas Austin	9:08:00	-	-	05:27:55	21:27:56	65:00:29
5 – Illinois State	9:12:00	-	16:12:55	00:32:06	16:32:06	66:45:42

=== Stage 4 ===
Team # and Name	Start, Normal (6/26)	Finish, Naperville (6/26)	Penalties	Stage Time	Total Elapsed
2 - Michigan	10:00:00	12:54:17	00:00:00	02:54:17	28:14:44
35 - Minnesota	10:01:00	12:48:25	00:02:00	02:50:25	30:26:53
10 - Bochum	10:02:00	12:47:39	00:00:00	02:45:39	30:34:50
16 - Stanford	10:03:00	12:45:09	00:05:30	02:47:09	31:59:44
42 - Missouri S&T	10:04:00	13:01:29	00:04:00	03:01:29	32:53:56
65 - Calgary	10:05:00	13:05:47	00:02:00	03:02:47	33:35:26
95 - Kaohsiung	10:06:00	13:07:38	00:16:00	03:17:38	36:25:00
28 - New Paltz	10:08:00	14:31:44	00:02:00	04:25:44	47:10:30
3 - Kentucky	10:07:00		00:36:18	05:06:18	47:11:27
11 - Northwestern	10:09:00	14:22:47	00:10:00	04:23:47	53:52:39
9 - Iowa State	10:10:00	13:22:13	00:00:00	03:12:13	67:29:55
88 - Texas Austin	10:11:00	14:02:04	00:05:00	03:56:04	68:56:32
5 - Illinois State	10:12:00	13:29:37	00:06:00	03:23:37	70:09:19
