= American Solar Challenge 2016 =

The 2016 American Solar Challenge (ASC) was an intercollegiate solar car race on July 30 – August 6, 2016. The event was won by the University of Michigan. It was the 13th American national championship solar car race held.

== Route ==
- Day 1: Sat, July 30: Start in Brecksville, Ohio; must reach Dayton, OH checkpoint.
- Day 2: Sun, July 31: Finish in Vincennes, Indiana.
- Day 3: Mon, August 1: Start in Vincennes, IN; must reach St. Louis, Missouri checkpoint.
- Day 4: Tue, August 2: Finish in Republic, MO.
- Day 5: Wed, August 3: Start in Republic, MO; must reach Beatrice, Nebraska checkpoint.
- Day 6: Thu, August 4: Must reach Gering, NE checkpoint.
- Day 7: Fri, August 5: Finish in Scottsbluff, NE.
- Day 8: Sat, August 6: Start in Scottsbluff, NE; finish in Hot Springs, South Dakota.

== Results ==
=== Overall ===
Rank	Team name	Stage 1 Time	Stage 2 Time	Stage 3 Time	Stage 4 Time	Total Time	Miles Credited
1	University of Michigan	10:59:41	11:41:22	19:09:51	6:35:52	48:26:46	1976.2
2	Dunwoody College of Technology	13:05:48	15:18:45	23:44:43	7:21:06	59:30:22	1971.5
3	University of Toronto	14:17:12	14:01:39	23:46:24	10:05:48	62:11:03	1914.6
4	Missouri S&T	15:27:36	16:25:48	24:20:04	8:01:12	64:14:40	1955.8
5	Principia College	13:04:53	15:34:05	24:03:16	11:49:50	64:32:04	1886.3
6	Appalachian State University	13:29:06	16:52:56	40:37:06	5:28:42	76:27:50	1724.5
7	Iowa State University	17:12:22	18:06:48	35:23:00	9:05:06	79:47:16	1783.9
8	École de technologie supérieure	15:32:58	18:28:48	39:06:48	11:44:00	84:52:34	1659.0
9	UC Berkeley	14:25:07	30:53:24	32:21:12	12:06:18	89:46:01	1530.9
10*	University of Minnesota (Cruiser)	14:44:36	18:08:24	48:19:40	11:33:18	92:45:58	1796.5
10	Polytechnique Montreal	14:20:08	21:18:54	55:27:56	4:44:17	95:51:15	1370.4
11	Illinois State University	16:59:57	36:51:54	41:40:30	13:50:01	109:22:22	1193.3
12	University of Kentucky	36:35:18	DNQ	DNQ	DNQ	DNQ	135.5

=== Inspector Awards ===
- Spirit of the Event: Minnesota
- Abraham Poot Teamwork: Appalachian State
- Safety: Poly Montreal
- Overcoming Adversity: Iowa State
- Array: Missouri S&T
- Mechanical: Michigan
- Electrical: Missouri S&T
- Dynamics: Iowa State
- Fastest Egress: Appalachian State

=== Stage 1 ===
Team # – Name	Brecksville Start 7/30	Dayton Arrival 7/30	Vincennes Finish 7/31	Stage 1 Penalty Time	Stage 1 Elapsed Time	Overall Elapsed Time
2 – Michigan	8:30:00	13:50:10	11:02:41	0:12:00	10:59:41	10:59:41
32 – Principia	8:31:00	15:06:02	13:20:53		13:04:53	13:04:53
51 – Dunwoody **	8:39:00	14:33:50	12:41:48	0:48:00	13:05:48	13:05:48
828 – Appalachian State	8:32:00	15:11:05	13:45:06	0:01:00	13:29:06	13:29:06
77 – Toronto	8:37:00	16:34:24	14:35:12	0:04:00	14:17:12	14:17:12
55 – Poly Montreal	8:35:00	15:43:48	14:40:08		14:20:08	14:20:08
6 – Berkeley	8:39:00	15:53:53	14:49:07		14:25:07	14:25:07
35 – Minnesota	8:33:00	15:52:18	14:51:36	0:11:00	14:44:36	14:44:36
42 – Missouri S&T	8:38:00	15:10:48	14:46:36	1:04:00	15:27:36	15:27:36
92 – ETS Quebec	8:36:00	16:30:40	15:42:58	0:11:00	15:32:58	15:32:58
17 – Illinois State	8:34:00	16:16:51	17:12:57	0:06:00	16:59:57	16:59:57
9 – Iowa State	8:37:00	15:53:08	16:54:22	0:40:00	17:12:22	17:12:22
3 – Kentucky **	8:40:00	–	DNF	18:05:18	36:35:18	36:35:18

=== Stage 2 ===
Team # – Name	Vincennes Start 8/01	St. Louis Arrival 8/01	Republic Finish 8/02	Stage 2 Penalty Time	Stage 2 Elapsed Time	Overall Elapsed Time
2 – Michigan	9:00:00	13:21:21	12:14:22	0:12:00	11:41:22	22:41:03
77 – Toronto	9:04:00	14:34:36	14:48:39	0:02:00	14:01:39	28:18:51
51 – Dunwoody	9:02:00	14:33:09	16:05:45		15:18:45	28:24:33
32 – Principia	9:01:00	14:45:50	16:15:05	0:05:00	15:34:05	28:38:58
42 – Missouri S&T	9:08:00	15:28:16	17:16:48	0:02:00	16:25:48	31:53:24
828 – Appalachian State	9:03:00	–	16:53:56	0:02:00	16:52:56	30:22:02
35 – Minnesota	9:05:00	–	Trailered	0:08:24	18:08:24	32:53:00
9 – Iowa State	9:08:00	–	Trailered	0:06:48	18:06:48	35:19:10
92 – ETS Quebec	9:06:00	–	Trailered	0:28:48	18:28:48	34:01:46
55 – Poly Montreal	9:05:00	–	Trailered	3:18:54	21:18:54	35:39:02
6 – Berkeley	9:04:00	–	Trailered	12:53:24	30:53:24	45:18:31
17 – Illinois State	9:10:00	–	Trailered	18:51:54	36:51:54	53:51:51
3 – Kentucky	DNQ					

=== Stage 3 ===
Team # – Name	Republic Start 8/03	Topeka Arrival 8/03	Beatrice Arrival 8/04	Gering Finish 8/05	Stage 3 Penalty Time	Stage 3 Elapsed Time	Overall Elapsed Time
2 – Michigan	9:00:00	14:30:31	09:15:27	11:21:51	0:18:00	19:09:51	41:50:54
51 – Dunwoody	9:02:00	15:25:54	10:37:52	16:12:43	0:04:00	23:44:43	52:09:16
77 – Toronto	9:01:00	15:20:26	10:29:03	16:06:08	0:11:16	23:46:24	52:05:15
32 – Principia	9:01:00	15:55:32	11:24:24	16:33:16	0:01:00	24:03:16	52:42:14
42 – Missouri S&T	9:02:00	15:41:25	10:56:10	16:48:20	0:03:44	24:20:04	56:13:28
6 – Berkeley	9:08:00	16:07:35	12:07:14	Trailered	4:21:12	32:21:12	77:39:43
9 – Iowa State	9:07:00	17:13:45	12:57:33	Trailered	7:23:00	35:23:00	70:42:10
92 – ETS Quebec	9:08:00	17:25:52	13:17:37	Trailered	11:06:48	39:06:48	73:08:34
828 – Appalachian State	9:05:00	16:00:51	11:35:11	Trailered	12:37:06	40:37:06	70:59:08
17 – Illinois State	9:07:00	16:46:45	13:08:50	Trailered	13:40:30	41:40:30	95:32:21
35 – Minnesota	9:03:00	17:00:42	13:09:35	Trailered	20:19:40	48:19:40	81:12:40
55 – Poly Montreal	9:09:00	17:22:51	Trailered	Trailered	27:27:56	55:27:56	91:06:58
3 – Kentucky	DNQ						

=== Stage 4 ===
Team # – Name	Gering Start 8/06	Hot Springs Finish 8/06	Stage 4 Penalty Time	Stage 4 Elapsed Time	Overall Elapsed Time
55 – Poly Montreal	09:11:00	13:55:17		4:44:17	95:51:15
828 – Appalachian State	09:08:00	14:36:42		5:28:42	76:27:50
2 – Michigan	09:00:00	15:29:52	0:06:00	6:35:52	48:26:46
51 – Dunwoody	09:01:00	Trailered	0:21:06	7:21:06	59:30:22
42 – Missouri S&T	09:04:00	Trailered	1:01:12	8:01:12	64:14:40
9 – Iowa State	09:06:00	Trailered	2:05:06	9:05:06	79:47:16
77 – Toronto	09:02:00	Trailered	3:05:48	10:05:48	62:11:03
35 – Minnesota	09:10:00	Trailered	4:33:18	11:33:18	92:45:58
92 – ETS Quebec	09:07:00	Trailered	4:44:00	11:44:00	84:52:34
32 – Principia	09:03:00	Trailered	4:49:50	11:49:50	64:32:04
6 – Berkeley	09:05:00	Trailered	5:06:18	12:06:18	89:46:01
17 – Illinois State	09:09:00	Trailered	6:50:01	13:50:01	109:22:22
3 – Kentucky	DNQ				
