= KUAS =

KUAS may refer to:

- Kyoto University of Advanced Science, university located in Kyoto, Japan
- National Kaohsiung University of Applied Sciences, university located in Yanchao District, Kaohsiung, Taiwan
