= University of Minnesota Solar Vehicle Project =

University solar vehicle team

The University of Minnesota Solar Vehicle Project, or UMNSVP, is a team of undergraduate students from the University of Minnesota that designs and constructs solar-powered cars. In its 31 years, it has established itself as one of the world's top solar racing teams, and the top Cruiser/Multi-Occupant Vehicle team in the Western Hemisphere, with top-two finishes in 18 of 34 events entered.

== History ==
=== Beginnings ===
The University of Minnesota Solar Vehicle Project was founded following the GM Sunrayce USA in 1990. With little to no prior knowledge, the team successfully built and raced Aurora I in Sunrayce 93.

=== Aurora Generation ===
The first generation of UMNSVP cars, called Aurora, mostly followed the "cutout" design typical of the 1990s, with a relatively flat body and a bubble canopy. Over three cars, the design was continually refined. All three Aurora vehicles had successful trips to international races, culminating in a 4th place in class finish in the 1999 Sunrayce and the team's first competition in the World Solar Challenge in Australia.

=== Borealis Generation ===
The Borealis series of cars represents the newer generation of solar cars: exotic, aerodynamic "manta-style" bodies with unlimited array area, able under ideal conditions to travel as fast as or faster than the flow of traffic on any road. All three Borealis cars were extremely successful, with two second-place finishes in the Formula Sun Grand Prix and a second-place finish in the 2003 American Solar Challenge.

=== Centaurus Generation ===
The Centaurus series of cars took the project to a new level by allowing the driver to sit upright while driving. Three vehicles were built in the series, and they quickly improved to achieve the levels of success the team enjoyed with the Aurora and Borealis series cars. Most notably, Centaurus II placed 2nd and 3rd in the 2010 American Solar Challenge, and Formula Sun Grand Prix, respectively. The team took first place at the 2011 Formula Sun Grand Prix.

=== Daedalus ===
Daedalus marked a drastic design change from the team's previous solar cars. Designed for the new cruiser class in the 2013 Bridgestone World Solar Challenge, Daedalus was the team's first two-seater car and emphasized practicality. It had padded seats, a sound system, and a Nexus 7 tablet display.

=== Eos Generation ===
Eos I was the UMNSVP's 12th solar vehicle and was designed and built for the 2015 Bridgestone World Solar Challenge Cruiser Class, like Daedalus. It featured improvements in both performance and practicality. Eos I was the first Cruiser car to compete in the American Solar Challenge.

Eos II was the UMNSVP's 13th solar vehicle and built upon the foundation of Eos I.

=== Freya Generation ===
Freya is the UMNSVP's 14th solar vehicle. Like the three cars before it, is a Cruiser Class vehicle. Freya is also the team's first four-seated vehicle. It was manufactured during the COVID-19 pandemic and was one of a thinned field to compete in the American Solar Challenge 2021. Despite its large footprint, its maneuverability won it first place in the Formula Sun Grand Prix. Like its predecessor, Freya included an interchangeable battery configuration, a fact that became important after a battery fire during the American Solar Challenge 2021. This design allowed it to continue the race, where it placed second, just behind Team Sunergy from Appalachian State University.

=== Achievements ===
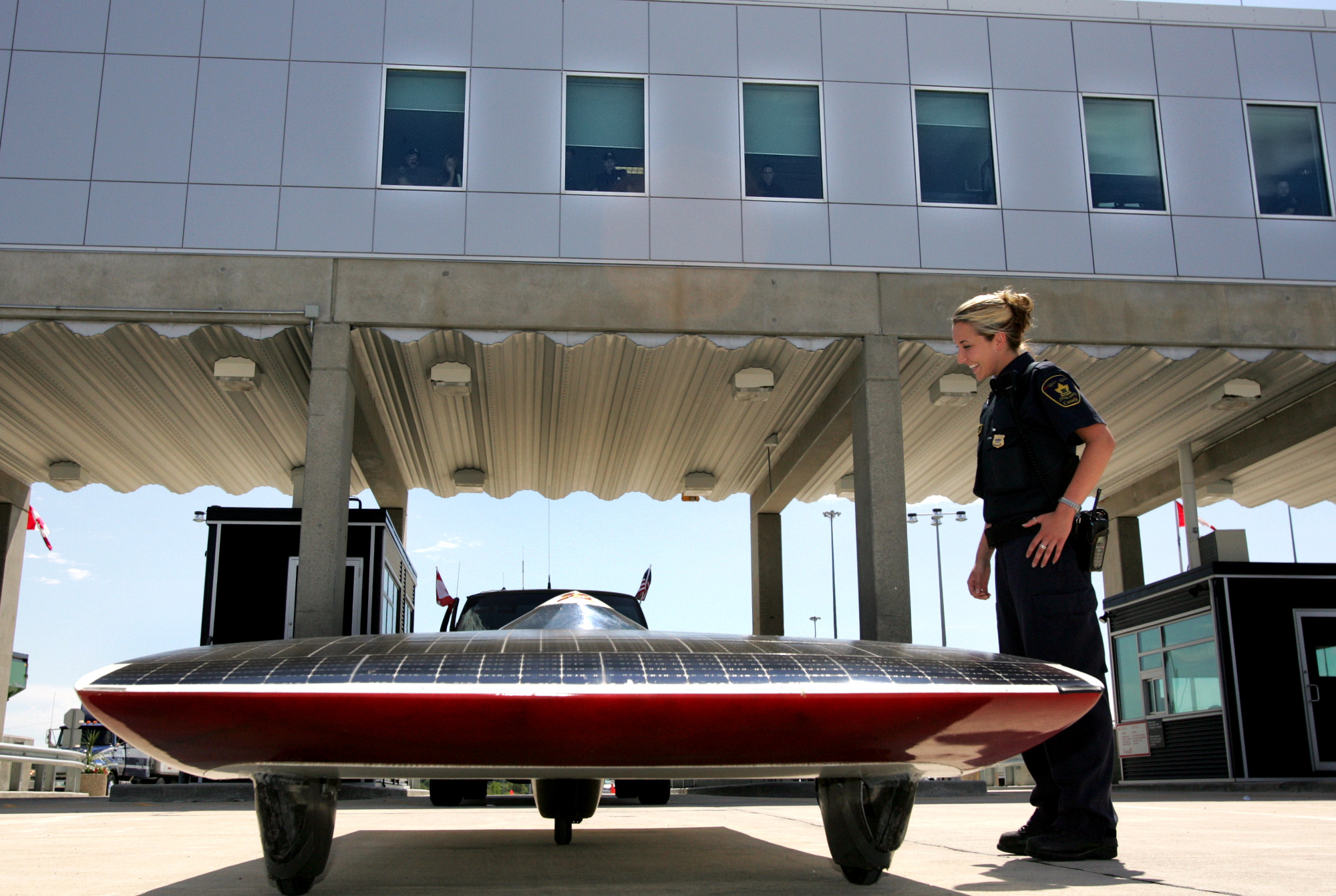
Borealis III crosses the border to Canada on July 21, 2005.

In 30 years of competition, UMNSVP has built and raced 14 different cars, assembling one of the best records in North American solar car racing. In the team's history:

- No car has ever failed to qualify for or finish a race
- First or second-place finishes in 19 of 35 events entered
- 8 top-five finishes in international competition
- Raced in five countries
- Finished second in the American Solar Challenge seven times
- 1st place victories in Formula Sun Grand Prix six times

UMNSVP takes great pride in being one of the very few collegiate solar car teams that researches, assembles, encapsulates, and attaches its own solar array. Almost everything on the car is designed, built, and programmed by team members.

On July 21, 2005, during the North American Solar Challenge, Borealis III passed from the United States to Canada to become the first solar car to cross an international boundary during a race.

Since the team's first race, UMNSVP has placed in the top five at the American Solar Challenge 10 times. No team has done that more often.

UMNSVP holds the record for the most FSGP victories, at six.

UMNSVP is the only American team to have finished in the top five in four consecutive World Solar Challenges.

In 2016, Eos I became the first Cruiser car to compete in the American Solar Challenge.

In 2021, Freya became the second American four-seated car to compete in the Formula Sun Grand Prix after Iowa State University's Penumbra, the first American four-seated car to compete in the American Solar Challenge, and the second four-seated car to compete in the American Solar Challenge, after Italian team University of Bologna's Onda Solare.

=== The future ===
The team is working on designing and building its 15th for competition in the 2023 World Solar Challenge.

== Team composition ==
=== Participants ===
The UMNSVP team is composed mainly of undergraduate students from the Twin Cities Campus of the University of Minnesota. Most of the participants are studying engineering in the university's College of Science and Engineering, but students of any major are welcome to join the team. The team is usually composed of 40 to 60 active students.

=== Subteams ===
The team is composed of five main subteams. Each team is responsible for designing certain components of the car, although all the systems must eventually be integrated with one another.

- The Composites and Structures Team (formerly called the Aerodynamics and Structures Team) is responsible for designing and constructing the outside shell of the vehicle. At most speeds, much of the power to drive the car is spent on air resistance. Thus, a shell with a low drag coefficient must be built. In addition, much of the vehicle construction involving lightweight composite materials is done by the Composites and Structures Team.
- The Array Team is responsible for creating the solar array that is the primary source of the vehicle's power. The Array Team does not just attach the solar cells to the car, but must also research and implement encapsulation techniques to protect the fragile solar cells. The University of Minnesota Solar Vehicle Project is one of the few collegiate teams that encapsulates and mounts their own array.
- The Electrical Team (formerly called the Controls Team) is responsible for designing, building, and programming all of the electrical systems of the car. This includes the batteries, power trackers, driver interface, telemetry systems, and the electric motor that drives the car. The primary goal of the Electrical Team is efficiency; the less power a device uses, the longer the car will be able to go.
- The Mechanical Team (formerly the Vehicle Dynamics Team) is responsible for the design and fabrication of the structural and moving parts of the car, including the brakes, suspension, steering, and chassis of the car. The largest challenges presented are to make the components as light and as small as possible so that the car may go faster.
- The Operations Team manages the project's fundraising and public relations, ensuring the team has a presence with both sponsors and various educational activities.

=== Administration ===
In addition to the five subteams, there is an executive team composed of leads from each subteam. The executive team is responsible for ensuring engineering timelines remain on track and the team remains funded and in good standing with the university.

As with any student group at the University of Minnesota, UMNSVP must have a faculty advisor. The faculty advisor is not directly involved with the design or construction of the car, but performs executive duties and serves as a contact to the University. The current faculty advisor for the team is Professor David Orser (Electrical and Computer Engineering). Previous faculty advisors include Professors Jeff Hammer, Patrick Starr, Virgil Marple, Paul Imbertson, and Philip Cohen.

== Good-luck charms ==
The team has several good-luck charms that it brings to race events. They include the Counter Sink and garden gnomes David Chrome Tip and David Chrome Tip Jr.

== Cars ==
The University of Minnesota Solar Vehicle Project has built 14 cars in its history:

=== Aurora I ===
Aurora I was the first vehicle built by UMNSVP. It is arguably one of the largest solar cars ever built for a race. It served as a solid basis of knowledge with which to work on future projects.

- Sunrayce 93 (Arlington, Texas to Minneapolis, Minnesota)
  - 21st Place Overall (out of 36)
  - Awarded "SAE Design Excellence in Engineering Safety"

=== Aurora II ===
Aurora II built heavily on the experience gained from Aurora I. It featured a complete redesign from the previous car and made the UMNSVP a permanent fixture in the world of solar car racing.

- Sunrayce 95 (Indianapolis, Indiana to Golden, Colorado)
  - 2nd Place Overall
  - Best daily average speed (50.4 mph)
  - Awarded "EDS Best use of Aerodynamics in Design"
- 1995 World Solar Rallye (Akita, Japan)
  - 2nd Place, Junior Class
  - 9th Place Overall (out of 79)

=== Aurora^{3} ===
Aurora³ was a redesign of Aurora II, with a focus on improving the efficiency of the car. It featured a more aerodynamic shape and an in-wheel motor, which was a vast improvement over Aurora II's chain driven motor.

- Sunrayce 97 (Indianapolis, Indiana to Colorado Springs, Colorado)
  - 11th Place Overall (out of 36), due to a brake failure after brake fluid that was incompatible with the seals on the brake system caused the team to lose most of a day for repairs.
  - Broke the Sunrayce daily speed record set by Aurora II in Sunrayce 95 with a 54 MPH average speed over the 166 mile journey from Smith Center, Kansas to St. Francis, Kansas
  - 3rd Place, teamwork
- 1998 World Solar Rallye (Akita, Japan)
  - 1st Place, Junior Class
  - 7th Place overall (out of 81)
- 2000 Formula Sun Grand Prix (Heartland Park, Topeka, Kansas)
  - 2nd Place Open Class
  - 3rd Place Overall
  - 1st Place, 1/4 mile drag race

=== Aurora 4 ===
Aurora 4 improved on the successes of the Aurora class of cars. The nickel-metal hydride battery pack was the first new battery technology used by the Minnesota team, and the solar array was the first to use two different sizes of photovoltaic solar cells. The team overcame a collision with its lead vehicle and many days of rain for a 4th-place finish in Sunrayce '99. It was the second 4-wheeled car that the UMNSVP built after Aurora I.

- Sunrayce 99 (Washington, DC to Epcot Center, Orlando, Florida)
  - 4th Place Overall
- 1999 World Solar Challenge (Darwin, Northern Territory, Australia to Adelaide, South Australia)
  - 4th Place, cutout class

=== Borealis I ===
Borealis I featured a major redesign from the tried-and-true cutout car. Instead of a flat shell with a "bubble" canopy, the team used an innovative "manta" shell design, where the windshield and canopy are integrated into the body of the car. Also, nearly all other systems were redesigned for higher performance.

- 2001 Formula Sun Grand Prix (Heartland Park, Topeka, Kansas)
  - 12th Place Overall (Qualified for ASC)
  - Fastest Quarter Mile
  - Inspector's Award
- 2001 American Solar Challenge (Chicago, Illinois to Los Angeles, California)
  - 6th place Overall
- 2002 Formula Sun Grand Prix (Heartland Park, Topeka, Kansas)
  - 2nd Place Overall

In early 2005, Borealis I was sold to the Illinois State University Solar Car Team, where it was refitted with new electronics and solar panels. ISU raced it as Mercury I in the 2005 North American Solar Challenge, where they finished 18th. Its chassis was re-used for their 2008 car Mercury II, but unfortunately, troubles with their motor prevented them from qualifying. In 2009, Mercury II finished 5th out of 11 entered vehicles in the 2009 Formula Sun Grand Prix.

=== Borealis II ===
Borealis II improved on the design of Borealis I, stressing first and foremost reliability, which resulted in a relatively heavy car. It overcame a number of mishaps that damaged the car to become one of UMNSVP's most successful projects to date.

- 2003 Formula Sun Grand Prix (Heartland Park, Topeka, Kansas)
  - 1st Place Overall
  - Pole Position
  - Esprit de Corps Award
  - Ironman Competition (Tire Change) Winner (Trevre Roys Andrews)
  - Pit Crew Competition Winner
- 2003 American Solar Challenge (Chicago, Illinois to Los Angeles, California)
  - 2nd Place Overall
- 2004 Formula Sun Grand Prix (Heartland Park, Topeka, Kansas)
  - 2nd Place Overall

=== Borealis III ===
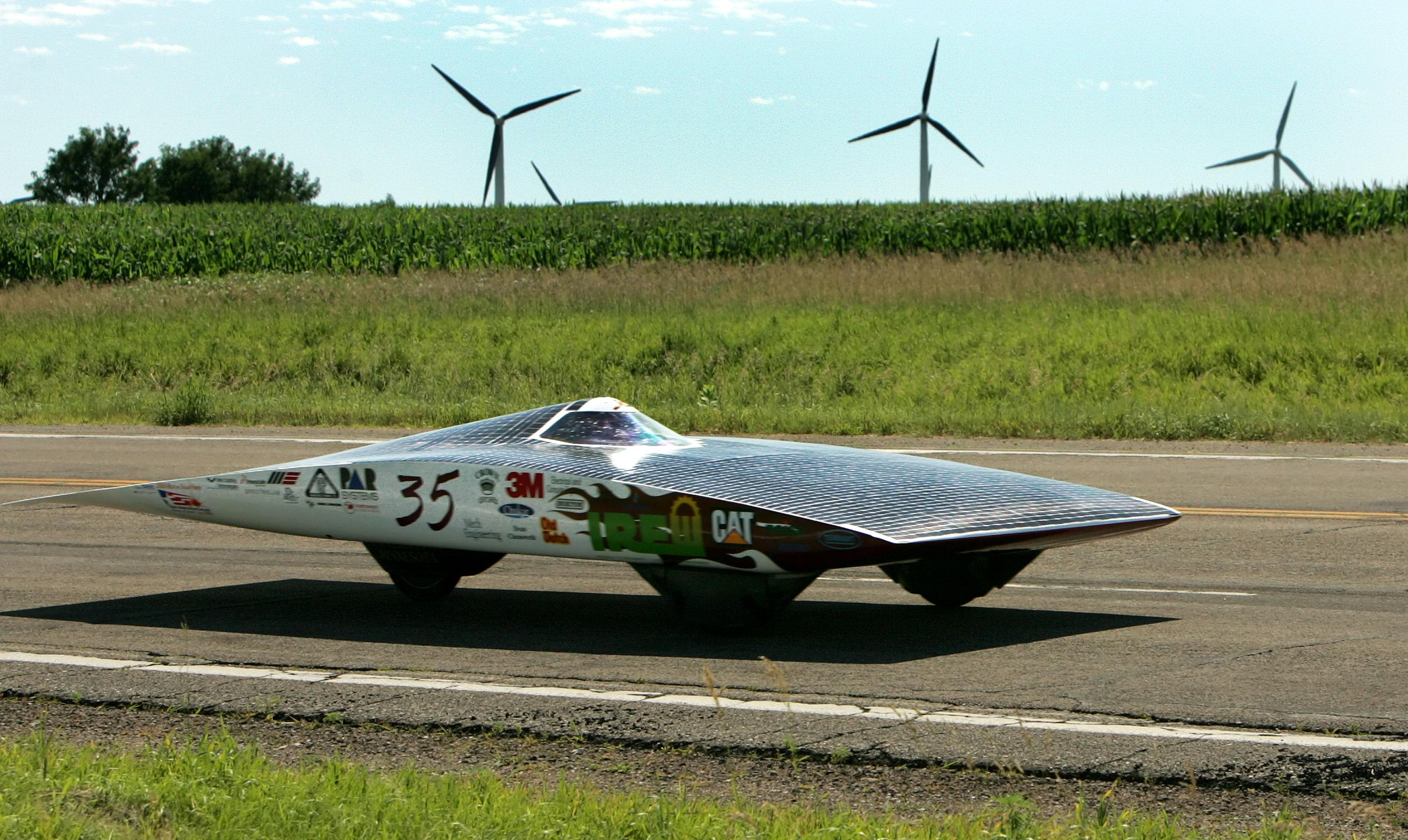
Borealis III leads the way during the 2005 North American Solar Challenge, passing by Lake Benton, Minnesota.

Borealis III improved upon its predecessors by stressing efficiency and weight reduction; the car weighs just over 400 lb. Borealis III was also the first solar car in history to cross an international boundary during a race; it did so on July 21, 2005, during that year's North American Solar Challenge.

During June and July 2006, Borealis III underwent slight modifications in order to race in the World Solar Rally in Taiwan in September 2006.

- 2005 Formula Sun Grand Prix (Heartland Park, Topeka, Kansas)
  - 1st Place Overall
  - Fastest Lap
- 2005 North American Solar Challenge (Austin, Texas, USA to Calgary, Alberta, Canada)
  - 2nd Place Overall
  - Espirit de Corps
  - Innovation Award
- 2006 World Solar Rally (Kaohsiung, Taiwan)
  - 4th Place Overall

=== Centaurus I ===
Centaurus I featured several major design adjustments from both previous series of cars. Due to a change in the North American Solar Challenge rules for 2008 requiring the driver to sit upright, the team was faced with the task of allowing the driver to do this while still minimizing aerodynamic drag. Many design components were reworked to fit the new style of vehicle and improve performance.

- 2008 North American Solar Challenge (Plano, Texas, USA to Calgary, Alberta, Canada)
  - 5th Place Overall
  - 2nd Place Stock Class
  - Fastest Qualifier Lap
  - Fastest Figure Eight
  - Most Prepared
  - Best Workmanship
  - Excellence in Mechanical Design
  - Espirit de Corps
- 2009 Formula Sun Grand Prix (MotorSport Ranch, Cresson, Texas)
  - 1st Place Overall
  - Fastest Lap

=== Centaurus II ===
Centaurus II was designed for the 2010 American Solar Challenge. Building off of experience from C1, the team managed to build a much lighter car (389 lbs empty versus 440 lbs for C1), as well as decrease the aerodynamic drag by a significant margin. Despite having one of the cheapest solar arrays at the event, the team managed to finish in 2nd place overall.

- 2010 Formula Sun Grand Prix (MotorSport Ranch, Cresson, Texas)
  - 3rd Place Overall
- 2010 American Solar Challenge (Broken Arrow, Oklahoma, to Naperville, Illinois)
  - 2nd Place Overall
  - Excellence in Dynamic Scrutineering
  - Excellence in Electrical Design
  - Sportsmanship Award (as voted by the teams)
  - Sportsmanship Award, three-way tie with Calgary and Northwestern (as chosen by the inspectors)
- 2011 Formula Sun Grand Prix (Indianapolis Motor Speedway, Indianapolis, Indiana)
  - 1st Place Overall

=== Centaurus III ===
Centaurus III was the culmination of the Centaurus series with improvements in weight and aerodynamics. Designed for the 2012 American Solar Challenge, it was slowed in the middle of the race by faulty thermistors. In 2014 it was renamed Centaurus π and was refitted with a new electrical system and a vinyl wrap for the 2014 American Solar Challenge. There the car realized its full potential by finishing 2nd overall despite having to overcome extensive water damage to the solar car and team equipment before the final day of the Formula Sun Grand Prix qualifying race.

- 2012 Formula Sun Grand Prix (Monticello Motor Club, Monticello, New York)
  - 6th Place Overall
- 2012 American Solar Challenge (Rochester, New York, to St. Paul, Minnesota)
  - 5th Place Overall
  - 1st Place, Stage 5
- 2014 Formula Sun Grand Prix (Circuit of the Americas, Austin, Texas)
  - 3rd Place Overall
- 2014 American Solar Challenge (Austin, Texas, to Minneapolis, Minnesota)
  - 2nd Place Overall

=== Daedalus ===
Daedalus marked a drastic design change from the team's previous solar cars. Designed for the new cruiser class in the World Solar Challenge, it was the team's first two-seater car with an emphasis on practicality. The team overcame electrical problems to be in the minority of teams to finish the race without trailering. Daedalus also marked a permanent switch from three-wheeled to four-wheeled solar cars.

- 2013 Bridgestone World Solar Challenge (Darwin, Northern Territory, Australia to Adelaide, South Australia)
  - 4th Place, Cruiser Class

=== Eos I ===
Eos I continues the team's focus on more practical multi-occupant solar cars. It differs from Daedalus in that the occupants are on either side of the catamaran shell with door on the sides instead of a canopy on top. Eos finished BWSC 2015 without trailering despite a more challenging scoring formula and regulations. In 2016, Eos I became the first Cruiser car to ever compete in the American Solar Challenge.

- 2015 Bridgestone World Solar Challenge (Darwin, Northern Territory, Australia to Adelaide, South Australia)
  - 5th place, Cruiser Class.
- 2016 Formula Sun Grand Prix (Wampum, Pennsylvania)
  - 4th place Overall
  - Sole Cruiser car
- 2016 American Solar Challenge (Brecksville, Ohio to Hot Springs, South Dakota)
  - 10th place Overall
  - Spirit of the Event Award
  - Sole Cruiser car

=== Eos II ===
Eos II incorporated significant aerodynamic and solar array improvements from the previous car. It competed in the 2017 BWSC Cruiser Class against teams from around the world, and finished with zero breakdowns. The following year Eos II won FSGP 2018, and competed in the first ever ASC MOV (Multi-Occupant Vehicle) class, leading the race for over 70% of the distance along the Oregon Trail, before experiencing an unfortunate electrical failure and finishing in 2nd Place.

- 2017 Bridgestone World Solar Challenge (Darwin, Northern Territory, Australia to Adelaide, South Australia)
  - 5th Place, Cruiser Class
- 2018 Formula Sun Grand Prix (Motorsports Park Hastings, Hastings, Nebraska)
  - 1st Place, MOV Class
- 2018 American Solar Challenge (Omaha, Nebraska to Bend, Oregon)
  - 2nd Place, MOV Class
  - Winners of stages 1, 3, and 5.
- 2019 Bridgestone World Solar Challenge (Darwin, Northern Territory, Australia to Adelaide, South Australia)
  - 5th Place, Cruiser Class

=== Freya ===
Freya is the team's newest solar vehicle and the team's first four seated vehicle. It won FSGP 2021 and took 2nd place in ASC 2021's Multi Occupant Vehicle class. It experienced a small battery fire, but despite this was able to continue the race and was given the nickname "Foenix".

- 2021 Formula Sun Grand Prix (Heartland Motorsports Park, Topeka, Kansas)
  - 1st Place, MOV Class
- 2021 American Solar Challenge (Independence, Missouri to Las Vegas, New Mexico)
  - 2nd Place, MOV Class
  - Best Practicality score, with a score of 86.17%
  - Spirit of the Event award
  - Safety award

== See also ==
- List of solar car teams
- Solar car racing
- World Solar Challenge
- American Solar Challenge
- Formula Sun Grand Prix
