= American Solar Challenge 2014 =

The 2014 American Solar Challenge (ASC) was an intercollegiate solar car race on July 21–28, 2014. The event was won by the University of Michigan. It was the 12th American national championship solar car race held.

== Route ==
- Day 1: Sat, July 21: Start in Austin, Texas; must reach Weatherford, TX checkpoint.
- Day 2: Sun, July 22: Finish in Norman, Oklahoma.
- Day 3: Mon, July 23: Start in Norman, OK; must reach Wichita, Kansas checkpoint.
- Day 4: Tue, July 24: Finish in Overland Park, KS.
- Day 5: Wed, July 25: Start in Overland Park, KS; must reach stage stop in Omaha, Nebraska.
- Day 6: Thu, July 26: Start in Omaha, NE; must reach Ames, Iowa checkpoint.
- Day 7: Fri, July 27: Finish in La Crosse, Wisconsin.
- Day 8: Sat, July 28: Start in La Crosse, WI; finish in Minneapolis, Minnesota.

== Results ==
=== Overall ===
Rank	Team name	Stage 1 Time	Stage 2 Time	Stage 3 Time	Stage 4 Time	Stage 5 Time	Total Time	Miles Credited
1	University of Michigan	10:49:38	10:21:20	5:49:00	10:27:00	4:00:31	41:27:29	1722.55
2	University of Minnesota	11:23:44	12:00:58	6:05:36	11:47:35	4:01:16	45:19:09	1722.55
3	Iowa State University	11:43:47	13:01:30	6:57:54	14:20:30	4:15:05	50:18:46	1722.55
4	Polytechnique Montreal	13:30:20	13:31:38	6:56:40	14:53:24	4:17:57	53:09:59	1722.55
5	Principia College	12:27:34	13:41:27	7:14:47	15:39:19	4:27:48	53:30:55	1722.55
6	Oregon State University	14:27:51	13:20:20	7:21:20	15:54:08	5:25:20	56:28:59	1722.55
7	Western Michigan University	15:42:25	16:40:06	8:38:54	19:39:09	5:20:15	66:00:49	1684.35
8	Qazvin Islamic Azad University	15:13:51	18:05:00	13:57:00	32:42:54	4:39:07	84:37:52	1328.25
9	University of Texas	22:32:00	DNQ				DNF	347.3
	École de technologie supérieure	Withdrawn					DNS	0

=== Inspector Awards ===
- Electrical Design Award: Principia
- Mechanical Design Award: Iowa State
- Safety Award: Oregon State
- Most Arduous Journey: QIAU HAVIN
- Teamwork Award: Oregon State
- Spirit of the Event: Polytechnique Montreal
- Solar Car Lifetime Achievement Award: Abraham Poot

=== Stage 1 ===
Team # – Name	Austin Start 7/21	Weatherford Arrival 7/21	Norman Finish 7/22	Stage 1 Penalty Time	Stage 1 Elapsed Time	Overall Elapsed Time
2 – University of Michigan	9:00:00	14:59:40	11:48:38	0:01:00	10:49:38	10:49:38
35 – University of Minnesota **	9:04:00	15:09:05	12:23:44		11:23:44	11:23:44
9 – Iowa State: PrISUm	9:02:00	15:21:38	12:43:47		11:43:47	11:43:47
32 – Principia College **	9:07:00	15:19:26	13:27:34		12:27:34	12:27:34
55 – Polytechnique Montreal: Esteban **	9:06:00	16:52:23	14:30:20		13:30:20	13:30:20
256 – Oregon State	9:01:00	16:26:55	14:39:51	0:02:00	14:27:51	14:27:51
73 – Qazvin Islamic Azad: QIAU HAVIN	9:03:00	17:34:47	16:13:51		15:13:51	15:13:51
20 – Western Michigan: Sunseeker **	9:05:00	17:33:23	16:42:25		15:42:25	15:42:25
8 – UT Austin **	9:08:00	-	Trailered	4:32:00	22:32:00	22:32:00
92 – ETS Quebec: Eclipse **	Withdrawn					

=== Stage 2 ===
Team # – Name	Norman Start 7/23	Wichita Arrival 7/23	Overland Park Finish 7/24	Stage 2 Penalty Time	Stage 2 Elapsed Time	Overall Elapsed Time
2 – University of Michigan	9:00:00	14:14:43	11:21:20		10:21:20	21:10:58
35 – University of Minnesota	9:01:00	14:45:39	12:58:58	0:02:00	12:00:58	23:24:42
9 – Iowa State: PrISUm	9:01:00	16:11:03	14:01:30		13:01:30	24:45:17
32 – Principia College	9:03:00	16:15:06	14:41:27		13:41:27	26:09:01
55 – Polytechnique Montreal: Esteban	9:04:00	15:40:36	14:31:38		13:31:38	27:01:58
256 – Oregon State	9:02:00	15:28:41	14:20:20		13:20:20	27:48:11
20 – Western Michigan: Sunseeker	9:03:00	16:46:14	17:40:06		16:40:06	32:22:31
73 – Qazvin Islamic Azad: QIAU HAVIN	9:06:00	-	-	0:05:00	18:05:00	33:18:51

=== Stage 3 ===
Team # – Name	Overland Park Start 7/25	Omaha Finish 7/25	Stage 3 Penalty Time	Stage 3 Elapsed Time	Overall Elapsed Time
2 – University of Michigan	9:00:00	14:49:00		5:49:00	26:59:58
35 – University of Minnesota	9:01:00	15:05:36	0:01:00	6:05:36	29:31:18
9 – Iowa State: PrISUm	9:02:00	15:59:54		6:57:54	31:43:11
32 – Principia College	9:03:00	16:17:47		7:14:47	33:23:48
55 – Polytechnique Montreal: Esteban	9:04:00	16:00:40		6:56:40	33:58:38
256 – Oregon State	9:05:00	16:26:20		7:21:20	35:09:31
20 – Western Michigan: Sunseeker	9:06:00	17:44:54		8:38:54	41:01:25
73 – Qazvin Islamic Azad: QIAU HAVIN	9:04:00	Trailered	4:57:00	13:57:00	47:15:51

=== Stage 4 ===
Team # – Name	Omaha Start 7/26	Ames Arrival 7/26	La Crosse Finish 7/27	Stage 4 Penalty Time	Stage 4 Elapsed Time	Overall Elapsed Time
2 – University of Michigan	9:00:00	13:17:11	11:21:00	0:06:00	10:27:00	37:26:58
35 – University of Minnesota	9:01:00	13:59:03	12:43:35	0:04:00	11:47:35	41:17:53
9 – Iowa State: PrISUm	9:02:00	14:57:03	15:29:30		14:20:30	46:03:41
55 – Polytechnique Montreal: Esteban	9:04:00	15:20:04	15:53:24		14:53:24	48:52:02
32 – Principia College	9:03:00	15:32:24	16:36:19	0:04:00	15:39:19	49:03:07
256 – Oregon State	9:05:00	-	15:51:08	0:03:00	15:54:08	51:03:39
20 – Western Michigan: Sunseeker	9:05:00	16:34:33	Trailered	1:54:36	19:39:09	60:40:34
73 – Qazvin Islamic Azad: QIAU HAVIN	9:07:00	Trailered	Trailered	14:42:54	32:42:54	79:58:45

=== Stage 5 ===
Team # – Name	La Crosse Start 7/28	Minneapolis Finish 7/28	Stage 5 Penalty Time	Stage 5 Elapsed Time	Overall Elapsed Time
2 – University of Michigan	9:00:00	12:48:31	0:12:00	4:00:31	41:27:29
35 – University of Minnesota	9:01:00	12:58:16	0:04:00	4:01:16	45:19:09
9 – Iowa State: PrISUm	9:02:00	13:17:05		4:15:05	50:18:46
55 – Polytechnique Montreal: Esteban	9:03:00	13:14:57	0:06:00	4:17:57	53:09:59
32 – Principia College	9:04:00	13:31:48		4:27:48	53:30:55
256 – Oregon State	9:05:00	14:30:20		5:25:20	56:28:59
20 – Western Michigan: Sunseeker	9:05:00	14:25:15		5:20:15	66:00:49
73 – Qazvin Islamic Azad: QIAU HAVIN	9:06:00	13:45:07		4:39:07	84:37:52
