= Sunrayce 99 =

Intercollegiate solar car race

Sunrayce 99 was an intercollegiate solar car race sponsored by General Motors, EDS, and the US Department of Energy. The race began on June 20, 1999 in Washington, D.C., and finished on June 29, 1999 at Epcot Center in Orlando, Florida. The event was won by the University of Missouri at Rolla (now Missouri S&T). Sunrayce 99 was the fifth and final race in the Sunrayce series and was followed by the first American Solar Challenge in 2001. The overall success of the event was limited by difficult weather conditions. Teams battled clouds and rain throughout the race, and no team avoided having to trailer their car for at least part of the race route.

Teams were allowed deviate from the traditional lead–acid battery technology for the first time in Sunrayce 99 when nickel–metal hydride batteries were approved for use. The new battery technology offered equivalent capacity to lead acid batteries but weighed several hundred pounds less. Nickel–metal hydride batteries were very expensive at the time, so only the most well funded teams could afford them. Unfortunately the rainy weather and slow speeds neutralized the advantage of the new battery technology.

== Route ==
- Day 1: June 20: Start in Washington, D.C., finish in Charlottesville, Virginia.
- Day 2: June 21: Start in Charlottesville, Virginia, finish in Raleigh, North Carolina.
- Day 3: June 22: Start in Raleigh, North Carolina, finish in Charlotte, North Carolina.
- Day 4: June 23: Start in Charlotte, North Carolina, finish in Clemson, South Carolina.
- Day 5: June 24: Start in Clemson, South Carolina, finish in Atlanta, Georgia.
- Day 6: June 25: Rest day in Atlanta, Georgia.
- Day 7: June 26: Start in Atlanta, Georgia, finish in Macon, Georgia.
- Day 8: June 27: Start in Macon, Georgia, finish in Tallahassee, Florida.
- Day 9: June 28: Start in Tallahassee, Florida, finish in Ocala, Florida.
- Day 10: June 29: Start in Ocala, Florida, finish in Orlando, Florida.

== Results ==
| Position | Car # | Team | Total Elapsed Time | Total Average Speed |
|---|---|---|---|---|
| 1 | 42 | University of Missouri - Rolla | 56:16:44 | 25.30 |
| 2 | 100 | Queen's University | 57:04:02 | 24.95 |
| 3 | 74 | Rose-Hulman Institute of Technology | 64:08:10 | 22.20 |
| 4 | 35 | University of Minnesota | 64:24:13 | 22.11 |
| 5 | 9 | Iowa State University | 65:28:13 | 21.75 |
| 6 | 43 | University of Missouri | 66:00:13 | 21.57 |
| 7 | 77 | Messiah College | 69:43:06 | 20.42 |
| 8 | 101 | École de technologie supérieure | 70:03:58 | 20.32 |
| 9 | 11 | Kansas State University | 70:23:48 | 20.23 |
| 10 | 24 | University of Waterloo | 72:42:15 | 19.58 |
| 11 | 33 | Ohio State University | 74:50:57 | 19.02 |
| 12 | 17 | University of Pennsylvania | 75:33:21 | 18.84 |
| 13 | 16 | Stanford University / University of California, Berkeley | 77:27:20 | 18.38 |
| 14 | 4 | Clarkson University | 78:44:03 | 18.08 |
| 15 | 7 | Yale University | 78:59:32 | 18.03 |
| 16 | 31 | University of Oklahoma | 79:17:27 | 17.96 |
| 17 | 2 | University of Michigan | 79:28:39 | 17.92 |
| 18 | 00 | University of North Dakota | 81:02:42 | 17.57 |
| 19 | 3 | Minnesota State University, Mankato and Winona | 82:23:12 | 17.28 |
| 20 | 98 | University of Toronto | 82:44:18 | 17.21 |
| 21 | 14 | Lincoln Land Community College | 83:28:48 | 17.06 |
| 22 | 314 | Purdue University | 84:05:37 | 16.93 |
| 23 | 454 | Western Michigan University | 85:10:50 | 16.72 |
| 24 | 8 | University of Arizona | 86:20:44 | 16.49 |
| 25 | 777 | South Dakota School of Mines & Technology | 89:39:23 | 15.88 |
| 26 | 32 | Principia College | 94:20:48 | 15.09 |
| 27 | 87 | University of Virginia | 97:58:13 | 14.53 |
| 28 | 21 | New Mexico Institute of Mining & Technology | 97:58:39 | 14.53 |
| 29 | 762 | United States Military Academy | 100:32:49 | 14.16 |
