= North American Solar Challenge 2005 =

North American Solar Challenge

The 2005 North American Solar Challenge (NASC) was an intercollegiate solar car race on July 17–27, 2005. The event was won by the University of Michigan, with the University of Minnesota finishing less than 12 minutes behind them, in what was both the longest and most closely contested race in the history of the event. The race was notable for being the first solar car race to cross an international border. It was the 8th American national championship solar car race held.

== Route ==
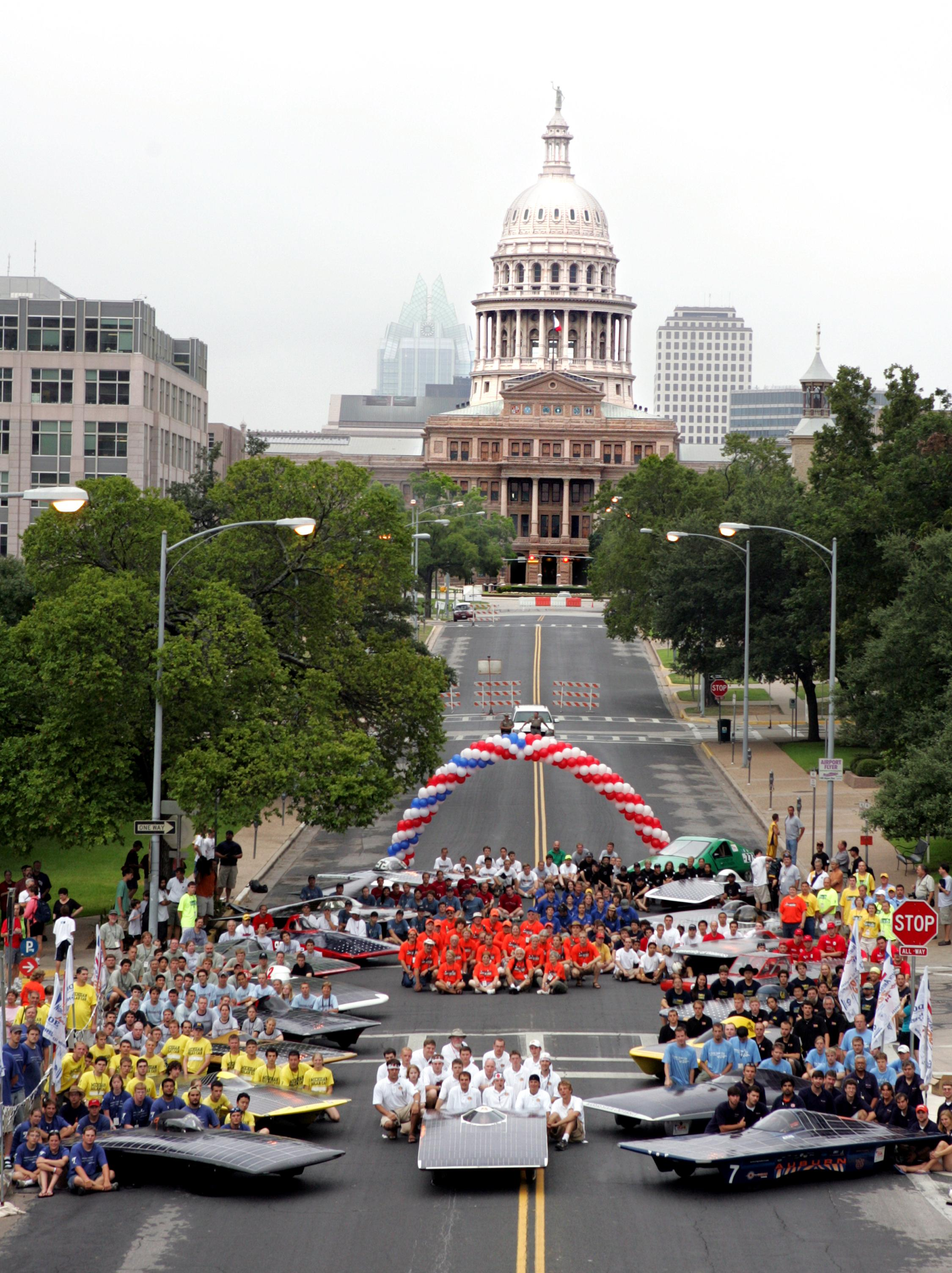
Race start in Austin, Texas

- Day 1: Sun, July 17: Start in Austin, Texas; finish in Weatherford, TX.
- Day 2: Mon, July 18: Start in Weatherford, TX.
- Day 3: Tue, July 19: Must reach Broken Arrow, Oklahoma checkpoint.
- Day 4: Wed, July 20: Must reach Topeka, Kansas checkpoint; must reach Omaha, Nebraska checkpoint.
- Day 5: Thu, July 21: Must reach Sioux Falls, South Dakota checkpoint.
- Day 6: Fri, July 22: Must reach Fargo, North Dakota checkpoint.
- Day 7: Sat, July 23: Finish in Winnipeg, Manitoba.
- Day 8: Sun, July 24: Start in Winnipeg, MB; must reach Brandon, MB checkpoint.
- Day 9: Mon, July 25: Must reach Regina, Saskatchewan checkpoint;
- Day 10: Tue, July 26: Finish in Medicine Hat, Alberta.
- Day 11: Wed, July 27: Start in Medicine Hat, AB; Finish in Calgary, AB.

== Results ==
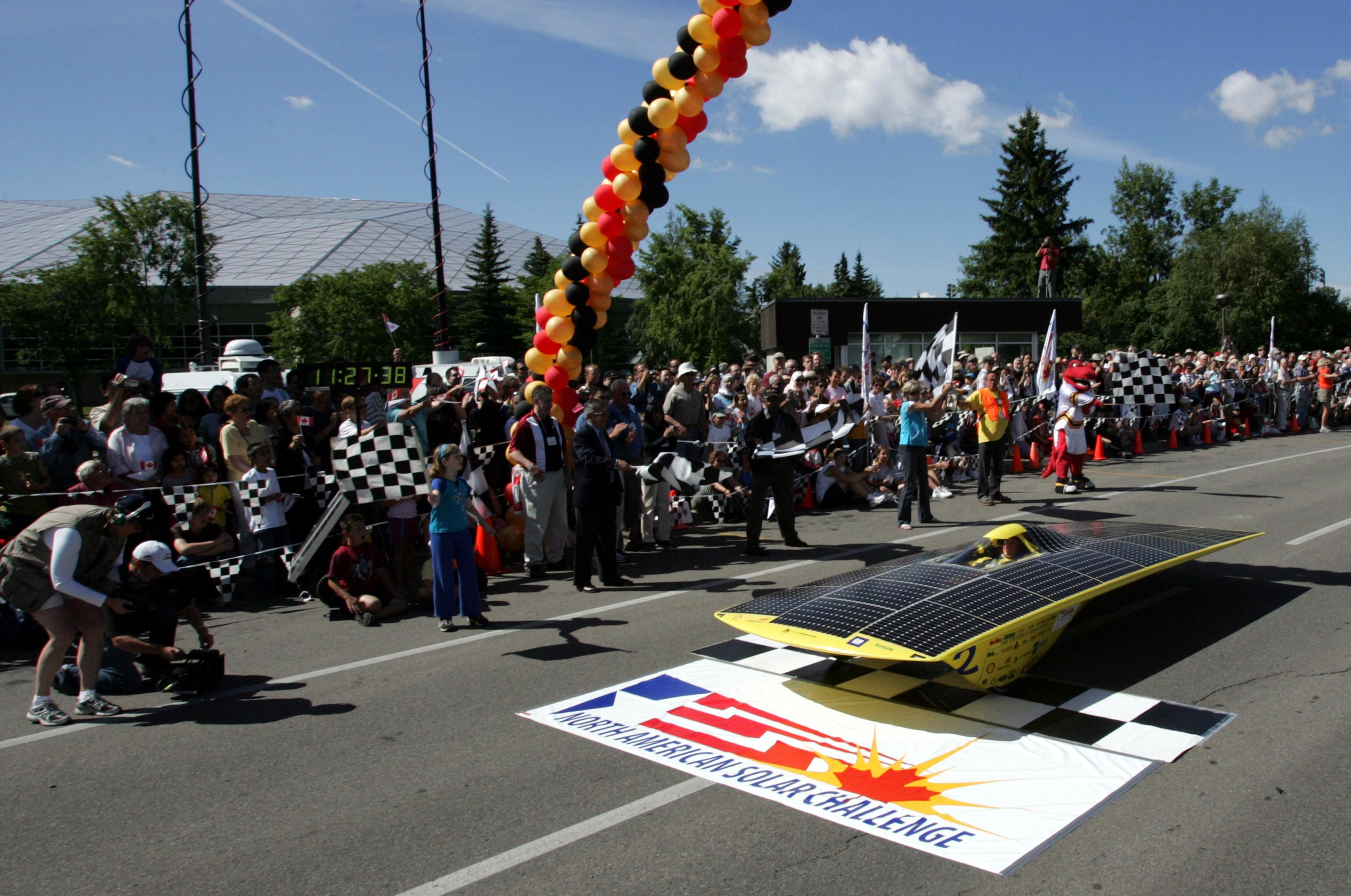
University of Michigan solar car crossing the finish line in Calgary

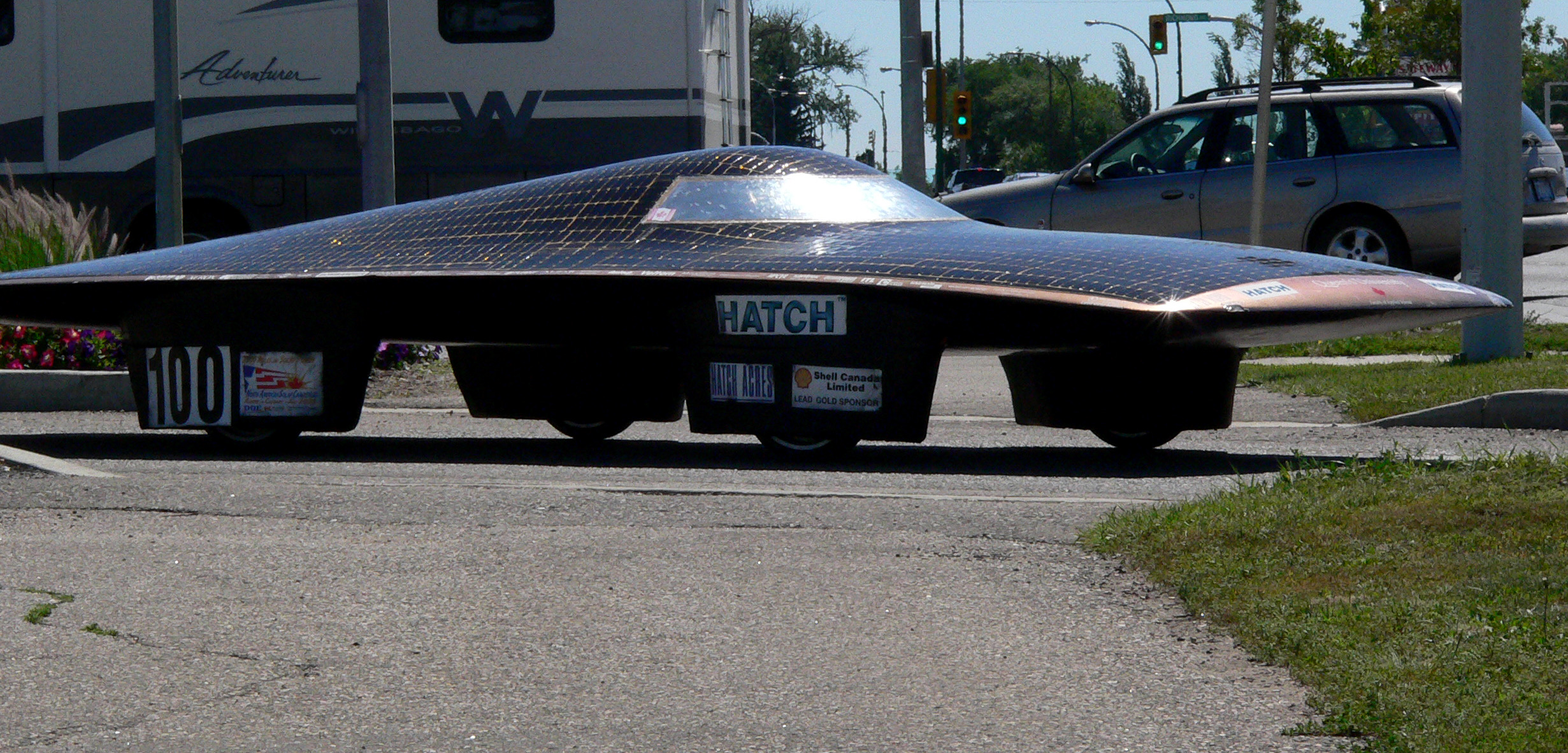
Queens University solar car in Brandon, Manitoba

Place	Organization	Car Name	Car #	Class	Race Elapsed Time
1	University of Michigan	Momentum	2	Open	53:59:43
2	University of Minnesota	Borealis III	35	Open	54:11:35
3	Massachusetts Institute of Technology	Tesseract	6	Open	56:34:43
4	University of Missouri - Rolla	Solar Miner V	42	Open	57:20:11
5	University of Waterloo	Midnight Sun VIII	24	Open	57:44:59
6	Western Michigan University	Sunseeker 05	786	Open	63:04:47
7	Principia College	RA 6	32	Open	65:26:00
8	University of Missouri	Suntiger VI	43	Open	66:09:07
9	Stanford University	Solstice	16	Stock	68:00:04
10	University of California, Berkeley	Beam Machine	254	Stock	68:25:17
11	Iowa State University	Fusion	9	Stock	71:30:50
12	Auburn University	Sol of Auburn	7	Stock	73:15:36
13	University of Calgary	Soleon	65	Open	73:55:13
14	Kansas State University	Paragon	28	Open	87:33:24
15	Queen's University	Ultraviolet	100	Open	112:33:59
16	Red River College	Red River Raycer	95	Stock	116:52:33
17	McMaster University	Phoenix	116	Stock	134:23:50
18	Illinois State University	Mercury I	88	Stock	138:02:54
-	Southern Illinois University Edwardsville	Cougar Cruiser	57	Stock	Disqualified
-	Northwestern University	nu'Nergy	11	Stock	Withdrawn
