= American Solar Challenge 2012 =

The 2012 American Solar Challenge (ASC) was an intercollegiate solar car race on July 13–21, 2012. The event was won by the University of Michigan. It was the 11th American national championship solar car race held.

== Route ==
- Day 1: Sat, July 14: Start in Rochester, New York; must reach stage stop in Erie, Pennsylvania.
- Day 2: Sun, July 15: Start in Erie, PA; must reach Mansfield, Ohio checkpoint.
- Day 3: Mon, July 16: Finish in Ann Arbor, Michigan.
- Day 4: Tue, July 17: Start in Ann Arbor, MI; must reach Kalamazoo, MI checkpoint.
- Day 5: Wed, July 18: Finish in Normal, Illinois.
- Day 6: Thu, July 19: Start in Normal, IL; must reach Verona, Wisconsin checkpoint.
- Day 7: Fri, July 20: Finish in La Crosse, WI.
- Day 8: Sat, July 21: Start in La Crosse, WI; finish in St. Paul, Minnesota.

== Results ==
=== Overall ===
Rank	Team name	Stage 1 Time	Stage 2 Time	Stage 3 Time	Stage 4 Time	Stage 5 Time	Total Elapsed Time	Miles Credited
1	University of Michigan	04:13:29	10:32:55	12:26:15	11:59:47	05:23:55	44:36:21	1652.80
2	Iowa State University	04:22:34	16:03:25	14:02:33	15:36:49	04:49:42	54:55:03	1652.80
3	Principia College	05:26:59	14:22:48	17:12:00	14:18:31	04:29:11	55:49:29	1652.80
4	University of California, Berkeley	05:34:35	15:32:19	16:04:08	15:33:46	04:37:17	57:22:05	1652.80
5	University of Minnesota	04:32:09	13:25:16	22:01:03	17:00:52	03:53:57	60:53:17	1572.45
6	Oregon State University	5:56:04	17:07:27	16:30:44	31:11:09	06:18:35	77:03:59	1390.05
7	Illinois State University	06:12:05	23:57:36	29:33:27	29:54:57	12:48:54	102:26:59	911.80
8	Western Michigan University	05:10:14	35:54:12	24:18:45	32:07:57	5:31:52	103:03:00	886.80
9	Montreal	07:21:18	32:25:12	28:46:39	28:58:57	11:38:15	109:10:21	829.35
10	SUNY - New Paltz	08:54:39	30:48:12	28:03:03	35:25:57	13:27:42	116:39:33	727.70
11	MIT	05:27:05	47:10:06	39:49:33	16:00:52	14:08:48	122:36:24	854.65

=== Stage 1 ===
Team # – Name	Rochester Start 7/14	Erie Finish 7/14	Stage 1 Penalty Time	Stage 1 Elapsed Time
2 – Michigan	09:00:00	13:08:29	00:05:00	04:13:29
9 – Iowa State	09:01:00	13:23:35	00:00:00	04:22:34
35 – Minnesota	09:05:00	13:36:09	00:01:00	04:32:09
20 – Western Michigan	09:02:00	14:11:14	00:01:00	05:10:14
32 – Principia	09:06:00	14:32:59	00:00:00	05:26:59
4 – MIT	09:09:00	14:18:05	00:18:00	05:27:05
254 – CalSol	09:08:00	14:42:35	00:00:00	05:34:35
256 – Oregon State	09:04:00	14:59:04	00:01:00	05:56:04
5 – Illinois State	09:03:00	15:15:05	00:00:00	06:12:05
55 – Montreal	09:07:00	Trailer	00:21:18	07:21:18
28 – New Paltz*	09:10:00	Trailer	01:54:39	08:54:39
13 – Michigan State*	09:11:00			DNF/Withdrawn

=== Stage 2 ===
Team # – Name	Erie Start 7/15	Mansfield Arrival 7/15	Ann Arbor Finish 7/16	Stage 2 Penalty Time	Stage 2 Elapsed Time
2 – Michigan	09:00:00	14:20:38	11:31:55	00:01:00	10:32:55
35 – Minnesota	09:02:00	16:01:45	14:23:16	00:02:00	13:25:16
32 – Principia	09:04:00	16:38:10	15:22:48	00:00:00	14:22:48
254 – CalSol	09:02:00	16:47:14	16:31:19	00:01:00	15:32:19
9 – Iowa State	09:01:00		16:03:25	00:00:00	16:03:25
256 – Oregon State	09:07:00		16:55:27	00:12:00	17:07:27
5 – Illinois State	09:08:00		Trailer	05:57:36	23:57:36
28 – New Paltz	09:10:00		Trailer	12:48:12	30:48:12
55 – Montreal	09:09:00		Trailer	14:25:12	32:25:12
20 – Western Michigan	09:03:00		Trailer	17:54:12	35:54:12
4 – MIT	09:05:00		Trailer	29:10:06	47:10:06

=== Stage 3 ===
Team # – Name	Ann Arbor Start 7/17	Kalamazoo Arrival 7/17	Normal Finish 7/18	Stage 3 Penalty Time	Stage 3 Elapsed Time
2 – Michigan	09:00:00	13:02:09	13:14:15	00:12:00	12:26:15
9 – Iowa State	09:03:00	13:29:33	14:57:33	00:10:00	14:02:33
254 – CalSol	09:04:00	15:08:08	17:02:08	00:02:00	16:04:08
256 – Oregon State	09:05:00	14:30:12	17:18:44	00:12:00	16:30:44
32 – Principia	09:02:00	14:15:17	17:57:00	00:15:00	17:12:00
35 – Minnesota	09:01:00	13:35:20	Trailer	04:01:03	22:01:03
20 – Western Michigan	09:06:00	14:26:34	Trailer	06:18:45	24:18:45
28 – New Paltz	09:07:00		Trailer	10:03:03	28:03:03
55 – Montreal	09:05:00		Trailer	10:46:39	28:46:39
5 – Illinois State	09:06:00		Trailer	11:33:27	29:33:27
4 – MIT	09:09:00	14:22:40	Trailer	21:49:33	39:49:33

=== Stage 4 ===
Team # – Name	Normal Start 7/19	Verona Arrival 7/19	LaCrosse Finish 7/20	Stage 4 Penalty Time	Stage 4 Elapsed Time
2 – Michigan	09:00:00	14:23:10	12:43:47	00:16:00	11:59:47
32 – Principia	09:02:00	16:21:44	15:16:31	00:02:00	14:18:31
254 – CalSol	09:03:00	16:31:04	16:30:46	00:03:00	15:33:46
9 – Iowa State	09:01:00	15:22:27	16:26:49	00:10:00	15:36:49
4 – MIT	09:10:00	15:33:23	16:04:52	00:56:00	16:00:52
35 – Minnesota	09:05:00	16:57:01	17:58:52	0:02:00	17:00:52
55 – Montreal	09:05:00		Trailer	10:58:57	28:58:57
5 – Illinois State	09:06:00		Trailer	11:54:57	29:54:57
256 – Oregon State	09:04:00		Trailer	13:11:09	31:11:09
20 – Western Michigan	09:04:00		Trailer	14:07:57	32:07:57
28 – New Paltz	09:08:00		Trailer	TBD	18:00:00

=== Stage 5 ===
Team # – Name	LaCrosse Start 7/21	St. Paul Finish 7/21	Stage 5 Penalty Time	Stage 5 Elapsed Time
35 – Minnesota	09:05:00	12:58:57	00:00:00	03:53:57
32 – Principia	09:02:00	13:31:11	00:00:00	04:29:11
254 – CalSol	09:03:00	13:28:17	00:12:00	04:37:17
9 – Iowa State	09:01:00	13:50:42	00:00:00	04:49:42
2 – Michigan	09:00:00	14:23:55	00:00:00	05:23:55
20 – Western Michigan	09:05:00	14:36:52	00:00:00	05:31:52
256 – Oregon State	09:04:00	15:21:35	00:01:00	06:18:35
5 – Illinois State	09:07:00	Trailer	05:48:54	12:48:54
55 – Montreal	09:06:00	Trailer	04:38:15	11:38:15
28 – New Paltz	09:09:00	Trailer	06:27:42	13:27:42
4 – MIT	09:11:00	Trailer	07:08:48	14:08:48
