= Pingtung Airport =

Pingtung Airport North
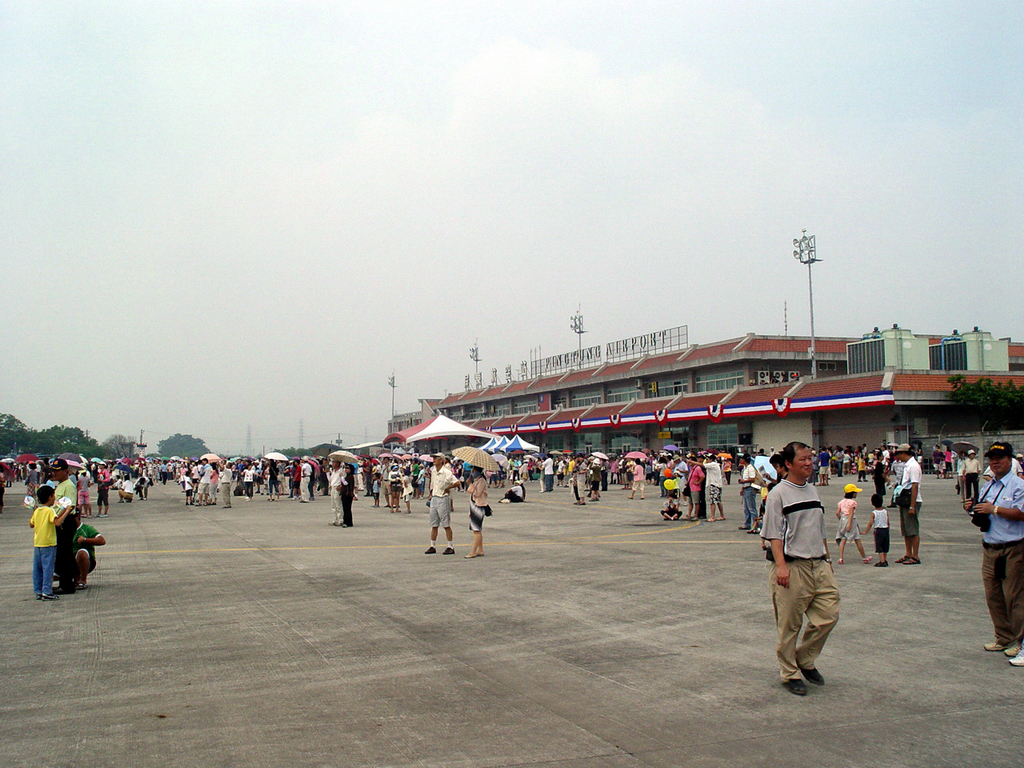
- IATA: PIF; ICAO: RCSQ

Summary
- Airport type: Public
- Serves: Pingtung, Taiwan
- Elevation AMSL: 24 m (79 ft)
- Coordinates: 22°41′43″N 120°28′40″E

Map
- Location within Taiwan Location within Southeast Asia Location within East China Sea Location within North Pacific Location within Earth

Runways
Direction	Length		Surface
Direction	m	ft	Surface
08/26	2,438	8,000	Asphalt

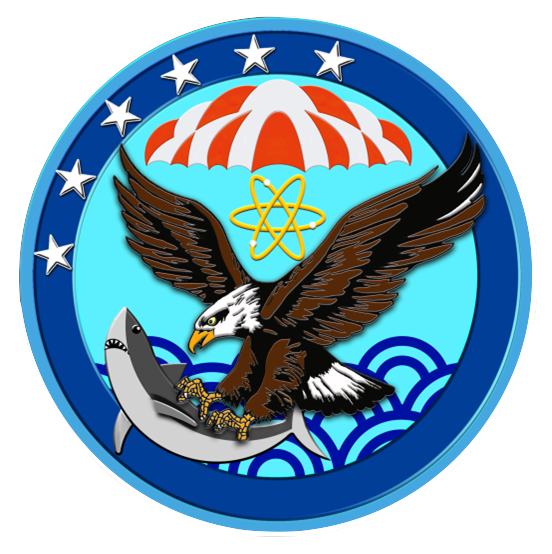
Pingtung Airport South / Pingtung AFB

Site information
- Type: Public
- Operator: Ministry of National Defense
- Controlled by: Imperial Japanese Army Air Force (1927–1945); Republic of China Air Force (1946–present)

Location
- Coordinates: 22°40′20″N 120°27′42″E

Site history
- In use: November 1920–present

Airfield information
- Identifiers: ICAO: RCDC

Pingtung Airport (Chinese: 屏東機場; pinyin: Píngdōng Jīchǎng) are two airports in Pingtung City, Pingtung County, Taiwan (IATA: PIF, ICAO: RCSQ). The airport is currently home to the Republic of China Air Force 6th Tactical Mixed Wing, and formerly offered commercial flights.

== History ==
Pingtung Airport was opened in November 1920 during Japan's rule over Taiwan. Originally, the base was used for "air policing", that is, the use of airplanes to govern indigenous peoples living in hard-to-reach areas. This practice ended in 1927 when the Imperial Japanese Army Air Service 8th Air Squadron was moved from Tachiarai, Fukuoka, to Pingtung. With further expansions and more military personnel moving in, Pingtung Airport served an important role in the Japanese military throughout the Japanese colonial era and the Pacific War. After Japan's defeat in the Pacific War in 1945, the base came into the control of the Republic of China Air Force.

== Commercial flights ==
Between 1936 and 1942, Japan Air Transport and later Imperial Japanese Airways operated commercial flights to Taihoku Airfield (now Songshan Airport in Taipei).

In November 1993, Pingtung Airport opened for commercial flights again. Since the passenger terminal was not completed, the Pingtung Performing Arts Hall was used as the airport terminal and passengers were shuttled to and from the south airport. In February 1995, a small passenger building was completed at the south airport; in 2005, a larger passenger building was completed at the north airport.

Originally, TransAsia Airways operated flights out of the airport until Uni Air took over in 2007. However, with the completion of Taiwan High Speed Rail in 2007, very few people took the flights anymore, and commercial flights ceased in August 2011.

== See also ==
- Transportation in Taiwan
- List of airports in Taiwan
