= Sunrayce 97 =

Solar car race

Sunrayce 97 was an intercollegiate solar car race on June 19–28, 1997. The event was won by Cal State LA, with the Massachusetts Institute of Technology finishing less than 20 minutes behind them. It was the 4th American national championship solar car race held.

== Route ==
- Day 1: Thu, June 19: Start in Indianapolis, Indiana; finish in Terre Haute, IN.
- Day 2: Fri, June 20: Start in Terre Haute, IN, must reach Effingham, Illinois checkpoint, finish in Godfrey, IL.
- Day 3: Sat, June 21: Start in Godfrey, IL, must reach Louisiana, Missouri checkpoint, finish in Fulton, MO.
- Day 4: Sun, June 22: Start in Fulton, MO, must reach California, MO checkpoint, finish in Lee's Summit, MO.
- Rest Day: Mon, June 23: Lee's Summit, MO.
- Day 5: Tue, June 24: Start in Lee's Summit, MO, must reach Topeka, Kansas checkpoint, finish in Manhattan, KS.
- Day 6: Wed, June 25: Start in Manhattan, KS, must reach Glasco, KS checkpoint, finish in Smith Center, KS.
- Day 7: Thu, June 26: Start in Smith Center, KS, must reach Oberlin, KS checkpoint, finish in St. Francis, KS.
- Day 8: Fri, June 27: Tue, June 27: Start in St. Francis, KS, must reach Anton, Colorado checkpoint, finish in Limon, CO.
- Day 9: Sat, June 28: Start in Limon, CO, finish in Colorado Springs, CO.

== Results ==
Position	Car #	Team	Total Elapsed Time	Total Average Speed
1	8	Cal State LA	28:41:34	43.29
2	1	Massachusetts Institute of Technology	29:00:20	42.83
3	16	Stanford University / UC Berkeley	29:33:15	42.03
4	12	Texas A&M University	29:47:21	41.70
5	74	Rose-Hulman Institute of Technology	31:37:54	39.27
6	111	University of Michigan	32:14:01	38.54
7	24	University of Waterloo	32:22:04	38.38
8	43	University of Missouri	32:25:38	38.31
9	480	Yale University	35:09:59	35.32
10	100	Queen's University	35:11:14	35.30
11	35	University of Minnesota	36:37:55	33.91
12	77	Messiah College	37:26:59	33.17
13	96	University of Western Ontario	38:14:32	32.48
14	22	University of Illinois	38:39:59	32.13
15	17	University of Pennsylvania	39:08:21	31.74
16	97	Western Michigan University	42:10:56	29.45
17	42	University of Missouri - Rolla	43:26:56	28.59
18	33	Ohio State University	43:42:59	28.41
19	00	University of North Dakota	47:44:40	26.02
20	3	Minnesota State University, Mankato and Winona	49:05:03	25.31
21	21	New Mexico Institute of Mining & Technology	50:46:46	24.46
22	27	United States Military Academy	51:29:25	24.12
23	66	McGill University	51:44:43	24.01
24	28	Kansas State University	53:43:00	23.12
25	29	Columbus State Community College	55:20:31	22.45
26	9	Iowa State University	65:32:29	18.95
27	2	California State University, Long Beach	67:31:32	18.40
28	76	Drexel University	69:47:09	17.80
29	101	École de technologie supérieure	71:03:34	17.48
30	6	Virginia Tech	75:29:19	16.46
31	32	Principia College	77:32:33	16.02
32	777	South Dakota School of Mines and Technology	79:43:46	15.58
33	11	Auburn University	90:24:06	13.74
34	741	Purdue University	91:09:45	13.63
35	504	University of New Orleans	93:10:10	13.33
36	7	George Washington University	19:06:17	0.00

- Not qualifying but ran the first leg of the race in their own was Middle Tennessee State University.
