= North American Solar Challenge 2008 =

North American Solar Challenge

The 2008 North American Solar Challenge (NASC) was an intercollegiate solar car race on July 13–22, 2008. The event was won by the University of Michigan. It was the 9th American national championship solar car race held.

== Route ==
- Day 1: Sun, July 13: Start in Plano, Texas; must reach McAlester, Oklahoma checkpoint.
- Day 2: Mon, July 14: Finish in Neosho, Missouri.
- Day 3: Tue, July 15: Start in Neosho, MO; must reach Topeka, Kansas checkpoint.
- Day 4: Wed, July 16: Must reach Omaha, Nebraska checkpoint.
- Day 5: Thu, July 17: Finish in Sioux Falls, South Dakota.
- Day 6: Fri, July 18: Start in Sioux Falls, SD; must reach Fargo, North Dakota checkpoint.
- Day 7: Sat, July 19: Finish in Winnipeg, Manitoba.
- Day 8: Sun, July 20: Start in Winnipeg, MB; must reach Brandon, MB checkpoint.
- Day 9: Mon, July 21: Must reach Regina, Saskatchewan checkpoint; finish in Medicine Hat, Alberta.
- Day 10: Tue, July 22: Start in Medicine Hat, AB; Finish in Calgary, AB.

== Results ==
Rank	Team Name	Total Time
1	University of Michigan	51:41:53
2	Principia College	61:38:45
3	Hochschule Bochum	63:47:55
4	University of Waterloo	64:00:06
5	University of Minnesota	65:41:48
6	University of Calgary	75:42:53
7	Missouri S&T	81:20:36
8	Iowa State University	91:12:59
9	Red River College	92:15:02
10	University of Arizona	98:26:12
11	University of Kentucky	100:33:24
12	Queen's University	106:36:20
13	Northwestern University	113:58:11
14	Durham University	134:07:06
14	Oregon State University	145:20:00
