= American Solar Challenge 2003 =

Solar-powered car race

Chicago, Illinois to Los Angeles, California.

== Results ==
| Position | Team | Car # | Class | Total Elapsed Time | Interval Miles Completed |
|---|---|---|---|---|---|
| 1 | University of Missouri - Rolla | 42 | Open | 51:47:39 | 2233.63 |
| 2 | University of Minnesota | 35 | Open | 56:36:31 | 2233.63 |
| 3 | University of Waterloo | 24 | Open | 58:11:20 | 2233.63 |
| 4 | Principia College | 32 | Open | 59:40:39 | 2233.63 |
| 5 | Western Michigan University | 786 | Open | 60:34:11 | 2233.63 |
| 6 | University of Missouri | 43 | Open | 61:33:50 | 2233.63 |
| 7 | Queen's University | 100 | Open | 65:50:13 | 2233.63 |
| 8 | Kansas State University | 28 | Open | 66:25:00 | 2233.63 |
| 9 | McGill University | 66 | Open | 74:33:48 | 2233.63 |
| 10 | University of Arizona | 8 | Open | 75:09:08 | 2233.63 |
| 11 | University of Toronto | 11 | Open | 79:51:39 | 2233.63 |
| 12 | Auburn University | 7 | Open | 90:51:39 | 2233.63 |
| 13 | Purdue University | 314 | Open | 96:50:09 | 1954.00 |
| 14 | North Dakota State University | 22 | Stock | 100:52:00 | 1759.58 |
| 15 | Stanford University | 16 | Open | 105:45:09 | 1664.09 |
| 16 | University of California, Berkeley | 254 | Stock | 110:52:15 | 1392.83 |
| 17 | University of Pennsylvania | 76 | Open | 122:40:46 | 1005.43 |
| 18 | Iowa State University | 9 | Open | 128:43:42 | 844.60 |
| 19 | California Polytechnic State University - San Luis Obispo | 5 | Stock | 132:35:17 | 694.21 |
| 20 | Texas A&M University | 12 | Open | 147:29:22 | 414.15 |
