= American Solar Challenge 2001 =

Chicago, Illinois to Los Angeles, California

== Results ==
Position	Team	Car #	Class	Total Elapsed Time	Interval Miles Completed
1	University of Michigan	2	Open	56:10:46	2247.39
2	University of Missouri - Rolla	42	Open	57:30:52	2247.39
3	University of Waterloo	24	Open	62:00:18	2247.39
4	Queen's University	100	Open	62:55:11	2247.39
5	Kansas State University	28	Open	65:22:55	2247.39
6	University of Minnesota	35	Open	66:59:20	2198.15
7	Principia College	32	Open	67:25:43	2247.39
8	Rose-Hulman Institute of Technology	74	Open	69:17:30	2247.31
9	University of Arizona	8	Stock	69:56:32	2247.39
10	Massachusetts Institute of Technology	6	Open	71:41:55	2247.39
11	University of Missouri	43	Open	72:28:49	2247.39
12	University of Toronto	1	Open	79:08:57	2247.39
13	Messiah College	77	Open	80:22:37	2247.39
14	South Bank University	41	Open	80:44:47	2247.39
15	Stanford University	16	Stock	90:58:16	2207.20
16	Iowa State University	9	Open	92:39:00	2048.36
17	Association FUTURA	63	Open	95:49:13	2067.82
18	Stanford University	91	Open	99:53:07	1915.38
19	Minnesota State University	3	Stock	103:55:00	1863.26
20	École de technologie supérieure	101	Open	106:00:57	1780.16
21	North Dakota State University	22	Stock	115:09:17	1523.88
22	Los Altos High School / La Puente Valley ROP	11	Open	121:41:50	1602.66
23	Western Michigan University	295	Stock	125:08:49	1425.05
24	University of North Dakota	00	Stock	127:17:35	1023.82
25	University of Virginia	87	Open	128:03:07	1812.28
26	Northwestern University	150	Stock	130:04:09	1164.33
27	Texas A&M University	12	Open	130:31:11	1400.93
28	University of Alberta	99	Stock	138:50:32	723.58
29	McMaster University	13	Stock	Withdrawn	90.10
30	University of Pennsylvania	17	Open	Disqualified	90.10
