= Sunrayce 95 =

Solar car race

Sunrayce 95 was an intercollegiate solar car race on June 20–29, 1995. The event was won by the Massachusetts Institute of Technology, with the University of Minnesota finishing less than 20 minutes behind them. It was the 3rd American national championship solar car race held.

== Route ==
- Day 1: Tuesday, June 20: Start in Indianapolis, Indiana; finish in Terre Haute, Indiana.
- Day 2: Wednesday, June 21: Start in Terre Haute, Indiana, must reach Effingham, Illinois checkpoint, finish in Godfrey, Illinois.
- Day 3: Thursday, June 22: Start in Godfrey, Illinois, must reach Louisiana, Missouri checkpoint, finish in Fulton, Missouri.
- Day 4: Friday, June 23: Start in Fulton, Missouri, must reach California, Missouri checkpoint, finish in Lee's Summit, Missouri. (Note: University of Michigan withdrew from competition after Day 4.)
- Rest Day: Saturday, June 24: Lee's Summit, Missouri.
- Day 5: Sunday, June 25: Start in Lee's Summit, Missouri, must reach Topeka, Kansas checkpoint, finish in Manhattan, Kansas.
- Day 6: Monday, June 26: Start in Manhattan, Kansas, must reach Glasco, Kansas checkpoint, finish in Smith Center, Kansas. (Note: University of Quebec withdrew from competition after Day 6.)
- Day 7: Tuesday, June 27: Start in Smith Center, Kansas, must reach Oberlin, KS checkpoint, finish in St. Francis, Kansas.
- Day 8: Wednesday, June 28: Tue, June 27: Start in St. Francis, Kansas, must reach Anton, Colorado checkpoint, finish in Aurora, Colorado.
- Day 9: Thu, June 29: Start in Aurora, Colorado, finish in Golden, Colorado.

== Results ==
Position	Car #	Team	Total Elapsed Time	Total Average Speed
1	17	Massachusetts Institute of Technology	33:37:11	37.23
2	35	University of Minnesota	33:56:00	36.88
3	25	California State Polytechnic University, Pomona	37:03:43	33.77
4	7	George Washington University	38:55:29	32.15
5	16	Stanford University	42:47:12	29.25
6	100	Queen's University	43:23:25	28.84
7	28	Northern Essex Community College	44:39:42	28.02
8	95	Western Michigan University	45:17:49	27.63
9	3	Minnesota State University, Mankato and Winona	53:29:33	23.40
10	43	University of Missouri	55:47:05	22.44
11	2	University of Maryland	59:11:47	21.14
12	76	Drexel University	59:34:22	21.01
13	500	University of Puerto Rico - Mayagüez	65:27:22	19.12
14	74	Rose-Hulman Institute of Technology	65:50:24	19.01
15	8	Kauaʻi Community College	66:54:00	18.71
16	777	South Dakota School of Mines & Technology	69:53:18	17.91
17	371	Purdue University	70:19:28	17.80
18	4	Clarkson University	70:45:04	17.69
19	9	Iowa State University	73:02:53	17.13
20	24	University of Waterloo	74:16:04	16.85
21	96	University of Western Ontario	75:37:03	16.55
22	77	Messiah College	77:51:10	16.08
23	31	University of Oklahoma	79:20:42	15.77
24	406	Montana State University	79:50:41	15.67
25	22	University of Illinois	89:38:00	13.96
26	27	United States Military Academy	90:42:11	13.80
27	12	Texas A&M University	91:36:38	13.66
28	90	Mercer University	91:43:20	13.65
29	109	Universidad Nacional Autonoma de Mexico	95:09:00	13.15
30	42	University of Missouri - Rolla	95:09:58	13.15
31	92	Columbus State Community College	99:59:25	12.52
32	195	California State University - Long Beach	107:20:06	11.66
33	33	Ohio State University	108:28:45	11.54
34	67	University of Pennsylvania	114:32:42	10.93
35	6	Virginia Tech	115:02:06	10.88
36	619	Prairie View A&M University	121:34:58	10.29
37	101	University of Quebec	86:54:54	0.00
38	1	University of Michigan	43:52:24	0.00
