= GM Sunrayce USA =

Solar car races

In July 1990, 32 teams of some of North America's brightest college students took to the road in solar-powered vehicles they had built during the previous year and a half. The GM Sunrayce USA route covered more than 1,800 miles, from Florida to Michigan. Three of the top finishers won a trip to Australia in November to compete in the 1990 World Solar Challenge.

== Route ==
- Day 1: Mon, July 9: Start in Orlando, Florida; finish in Floral City, FL.
- Day 2: Tue, July 10: Start in Floral Park, FL; finish in Tallahassee, FL.
- Day 3: Wed, July 11: Start in Tallahassee, FL; finish in Montgomery, Alabama.
- Day 4: Thu, July 12: Start in Montgomery, AL; finish in Haleyville, AL.
- Day 5: Fri, July 13: Start in Haleyville, AL; finish in Spring Hill, Tennessee.
- Day 6: Sat, July 14: Start in Spring Hill, TN; finish in Bowling Green, Kentucky.
- Day 7: Sun, July 15: Start in Bowling Green, KY; finish in Louisville, KY.
- Day 8: Sun, July 16: Start in Louisville, KY; finish in Indianapolis, Indiana.
- Day 9: Mon, July 17: Start in Indianapolis, IN; finish in Greenville, Ohio.
- Day 10: Tue, July 18: Start in Greenville, OH; finish in Mason, Michigan.
- Day 11: Wed, July 19: Start in Mason, MI; finish in Warren, MI.

== Results ==
Position	Team	Car Name	Time
1	University of Michigan	Sunrunner	72:50:47
2	Western Washington University	Viking XX	74:10:06
3	University of Maryland	Pride of Maryland	80:10:55
4	Cal State LA	Solar Eagle	81:03:44
5	Crowder College	Star II	81:06:18
6	MIT	Galaxy	83:57:37
7	Stanford University	SUnSUrfer	93:56:53
8	Western Michigan - Jordan	Sunseeker	96:55:20
9	Colorado State University	Stelar V	97:55:06
10	Cal Poly - Pomona	Solar Flair	99:05:57
11	Drexel University	SunDragon	100:03:40
12	RIT	Spirit	104:21:18
13	Stark State College	Solis Tyrannus Cognoscis	105:06:47
14	Worcester Poly	Starduster	106:34:60
15	Auburn University	Sol of Auburn	107:24:35
16	Minnesota State University, Mankato	Northern Light	108:18:45
17	Iowa State University	PrISUm	109:08:29
18	University of North Texas	Centennial	110:48:04
19	Cal State - Northridge	CSUN - Blazer	110:49:57
20	Rose-Hulman Institute of Technology	Solar Phantom	111:07:44
21	Cal Poly - San Luis Obispo	Sun Luis	113:00:15
22	University of Texas	Texas Native Sun	113:15:25
23	Dartmouth College	Sunvox III	113:48:13
24	University of Waterloo	Midnight Sun	114:37:15
25	Florida Institute of Technology	Sunshine Special	116:39:41
26	University of Pennsylvania	Solstation	122:14:48
27	Virginia Tech	VT Solaray	130:27:08
28	Clarkson University	Kalahkwaneha	131:52:00
29	University of Ottawa	Team Ralos	132:48:18
30	University of Puerto Rico	The Shining Star	135:44:30
31	Arizona State University	Sun Devil Cruiser	136:49:18
32	Villanova University	Wild Solarcat	137:04:11
