= Sunrayce 93 =

1993 solar car race in the US

Sunrayce 93 was a solar car race across the United States, traveling from Arlington, Texas, to Minneapolis, Minnesota. It took place June 20–26, 1993, and featured 34 university teams. In the race, teams from colleges and universities throughout North America designed, built, tested, and raced solar-powered vehicles in a long distance road rally-style event. The first place car was Maize & Blue from the University of Michigan, winning their second championship.

== Route ==
- Day 1: Sunday, June 20: Start in Dallas, Texas; must reach Whitesboro, Texas checkpoint; finish in Ada, Oklahoma.
- Day 2: Monday, June 21: Start in Ada, Oklahoma; must reach Shawnee, Oklahoma checkpoint; finish in Tulsa, Oklahoma.
- Day 3: Tuesday, June 22: Start in Tulsa, Oklahoma; must reach Miami, Oklahoma checkpoint; finish in Fort Scott, Kansas.
- Day 4: Wednesday, June 23: Start in Fort Scott, Kansas; must reach Kansas City, Missouri checkpoint; finish in Cameron, Missouri.
- Day 5: Thursday, June 24: Start in Cameron, Missouri; must reach Lineville, Iowa checkpoint; finish in Des Moines, Iowa.
- Day 6: Friday, June 25: Start in Des Moines, Iowa; must reach Iowa Falls, Iowa checkpoint; finish in Albert Lea, Minnesota.
- Day 7: Saturday, June 26: Start in Albert Lea, Minnesota; finish in Minneapolis, Minnesota.

== Overall standings ==
Position	Team	Total Elapsed Time	Total Average Speed
1	University of Michigan	40:39:18	27.29
2	California State Polytechnic University, Pomona	42:09:20	26.32
3	California State University, Los Angeles	45:26:58	24.41
4	George Washington University	46:06:55	24.06
5	Stanford University	52:48:46	21.01
6	University of Maryland	55:42:30	19.92
7	University of Oklahoma	64:18:36	17.25
8	University of Massachusetts, Lowell	66:39:20	16.65
9	Kauaʻi Community College	68:52:39	16.11
10	Iowa State University	70:17:42	15.78
11	McGill University	70:34:35	15.72
12	California State University, Fresno	75:30:23	14.69
13	Arizona State University	78:04:24	14.21
14	Queen's University	78:14:48	14.18
15	Rose-Hulman Institute of Technology	79:41:30	13.92
16	Minnesota State University, Mankato	79:52:53	13.89
17	Drexel University	81:04:11	13.69
18	Western Michigan University	81:09:32	13.67
19	University of Missouri	82:57:17	13.37
20	Virginia Polytechnic Institute	85:14:13	13.02
21	University of Minnesota	85:17:23	13.01
22	Rochester Institute of Technology	85:45:47	12.94
23	Stark State College of Technology	86:02:02	12.90
24	Colorado State University	87:02:00	12.75
25	Auburn University	90:04:22	12.32
26	University of Ottawa	90:19:11	12.28
27	University of Puerto Rico	91:06:11	12.18
28	Clarkson University	91:51:14	12.08
29	University of Missouri, Rolla	96:07:16	11.54
30	Mercer University	96:17:15	11.52
31	University of California, Berkeley	98:25:46	11.27
32	University of Texas, Austin	101:59:37	10.88
33	University of Waterloo	108:09:18	10.26
34	New Mexico Institute of Mining and Technology	117:48:11	9.42
