= National Kaohsiung University of Applied Sciences =

University in Taiwan

Coordinates: 22°39′5.6″N 120°19′42″E

- 國立高雄應用科技大學
- Motto: 弘、毅、精、勤 (Chinese)
- Motto in English: Altruism, Perseverance, Competence, and Diligence
- Type: Public
- Active: 1963–31 January 2018
- President: Ching-Yu Yang
- Academic staff: 500
- Undergraduates: 6,617
- Postgraduates: 3,034
- Location: Sanmin and Yanchao, Kaohsiung, Taiwan
- Campus: Kaohsiung area, 34.27 acres(138,700 square meter), Yanchao area, 262.67 acres (1,063,000 square meter)
- Website: www.nkust.edu.tw

National Kaohsiung University of Applied Sciences
- Traditional Chinese: 國立高雄應用科技大學
- Tongyong Pinyin: Guólì Gāosyóng yìyòng kējìdàsyué
Transcriptions
Standard Mandarin
- Hanyu Pinyin: Guólì Gāoxióng yìyòng kējìdàxué
- Wade–Giles: Kuoli Kao-hsiung I-yung k'e-chi ta-hsüeh
- Tongyong Pinyin: Guólì Gāosyóng yìyòng kējìdàsyué
- Yale Romanization: Gwólì Gāusyúng yìyòng kējìdàsywé
- IPA: [kwǒlî káʊɕjʊ̌ŋ îjʊ̂ŋ kʰɤ́tɕîtâɕɥě]
Southern Min
- Hokkien POJ: Kok-li̍p Ko-hiông Èng-iōng Kho-ki-tai-ha̍k

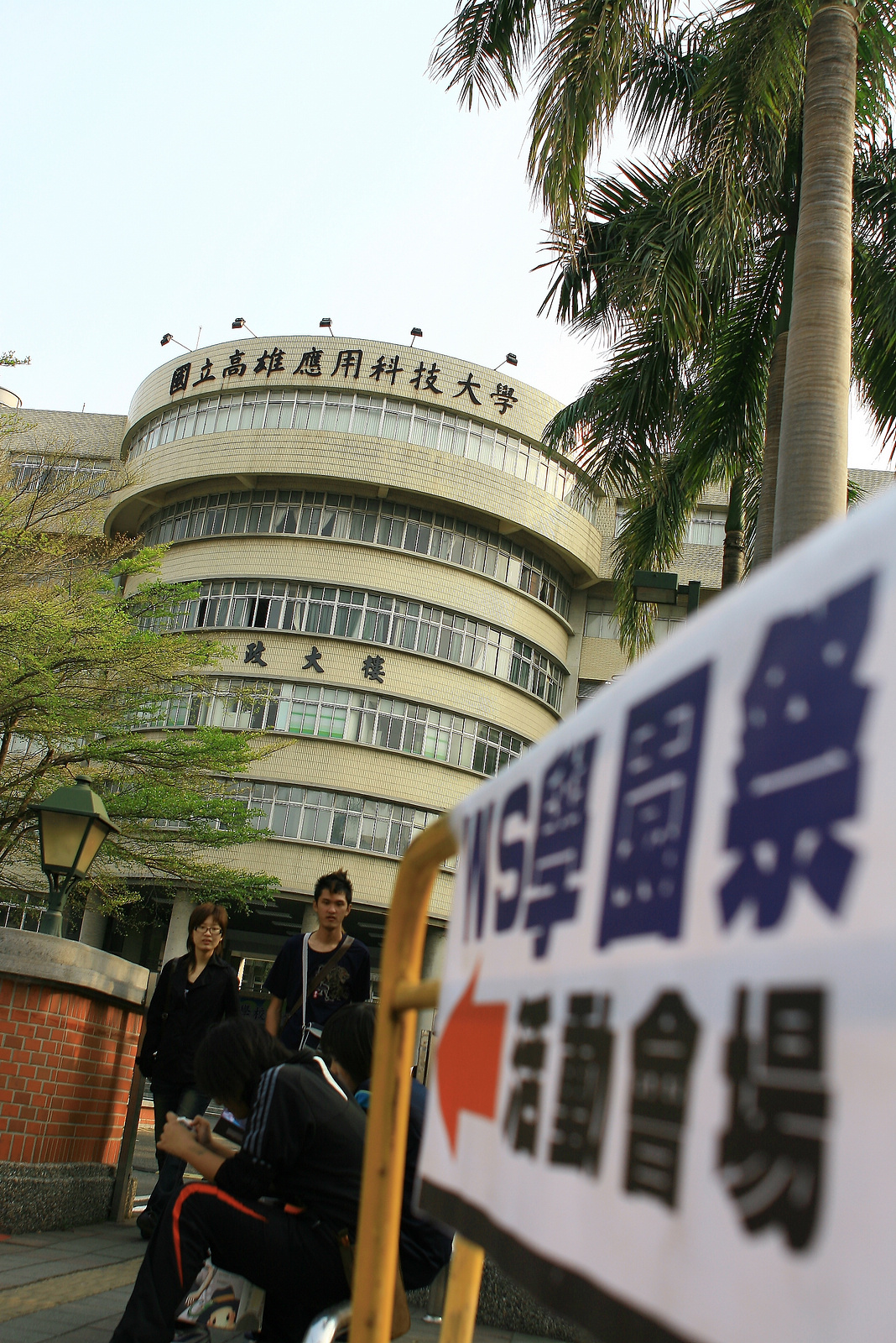
National Kaohsiung University of Applied Sciences

National Kaohsiung University of Applied Sciences (KUAS; Chinese: 國立高雄應用科技大學; pinyin: Guólì Gāoxióng Yìngyòng Kējì Dàxué) was a university located in Yanchao District, Kaohsiung, Taiwan.

== History ==
- In 1963, Taiwan Provincial Government assigned funds to establish the Provincial Kaohsiung Institute of Technology at its present location.
- In the fall of 1963, the Institute opened its gates to admit junior high graduates to Chemical Engineering and Civil Engineering Departments for five-year programs.
- Since 1965, studies have begun successively in Mechanical Engineering, Electrical Engineering, Electronic Engineering, and Mold & Die Engineering Departments.
- In 1965, the two-year night-school program was set up to offer training in the field of Chemical Engineering, Civil Engineering, Mechanical Engineering, Electrical Engineering, Electronic Engineering, and Mold & Die Engineering, as well as Industrial Engineering & Management.
- In 1972, the Institute initiated a two-year daytime program for senior high school (vocational) graduates. It was offered in Chemical, Civil, Electrical, Electronic, Mechanical, Mold & Die Engineering as well as Industrial Engineering & Management Departments.
- In October 1979, the Supplementary School affiliated with the Institute was founded. It offered two-year programs for young professionals. The course took three years to complete and was held on Saturday nights and Sundays in the field of engineering.
- In October 1991, Dr. Kuang-Chih Huang was appointed the Head of the Institute. He strengthened the faculty and enhanced the quality of teaching and of research.
- In August 1992, the two-year programs were established in Accounting & Statistics, International Trade, Business Management, Banking & Insurance, Finance & Tax, and Tourism Departments.
- In January 1993, the Kaohsiung County Government designated a large plot of land (106.3 hectares) at Shen-sui farm to be the second campus of the Institute. The construction of this campus is currently underway.
- In 1997, NKIT was promoted to technical college status. A senior two-year undergraduate program was offered in Chemical, Civil, Electrical, Electronic, and Mold & Die Engineering Departments. The following year, the programs expanded to include Mechanical Engineering, Business Administration, and Accounting.
- In the summer of 1998, night school under the Division of Continual and Extended Education started to offer the senior-two-year undergraduate program in Chemical and Civil Engineering. The Supplementary School was renamed to become the Institute of Continual Education, NKIT, and now offers a senior-two-year undergraduate program.
- In August 1999, the four-year bachelor's degree program was established for the first time in Mold & Die, International Trade, Finance, and Tourism Management Departments.
- In August 2000, the Institute was promoted and renamed the National Kaohsiung University of Applied Sciences.
- In August 2001, Dr. Kuang-chih Huang retired and Dr. Ren-yih Lin took over as the acting president. Four departments—Applied Foreign Languages, Cultural Business, Human Resources and Information Management—were set up. The first three departments constituted the College of Humanities & Social Sciences. Later, Colleges of Engineering, of Commerce, and of Management were also established. Moreover, the university started to offer master's degree programs in Civil Engineering & Disaster Prevention Technology, in Electrical & Control Engineering, and in Electronic & Information Engineering.
- In August 2002, five more master programs were initiated, in the fields of Chemical Engineering, Mold and Die-Making Engineering, Mechanical and Precision Engineering, Industrial Engineering & Management, and Commerce.
- In October 2002, Dr. Ren-Yih Lin was elected the President of KUAS.
- In August 2003, the College of Commerce merged with the College of Management. Department of Electrical Engineering started to offer the first doctorate program at the university. Two more graduate schools were set up in the business field—that of Finance & Information and of Tourism and Hospitality Management.

== Academics ==
=== College of Engineering ===
- Department of Chemical and Materials Engineering
- Department of Civil Engineering
- Department of Mold and Die Engineering
- Department of Industrial Engineering and Management
- Department of Mechanical Engineering

=== College of Electrical Engineering and Computer Science ===
- Department of Electrical Engineering
- Department of Electronic Engineering
- Department of Computer Science and Information Engineering
- Graduate Institute of Photonics and Communications

=== College of Management ===
- Graduate Institute of Commerce
- Department of Accounting
- Department of International Business
- Department of Public Finance and Taxation
- Department of Finance
- Graduate Institute of Finance and Information
- Department of Business Administration
- Department of Tourism Management
- Department of Information Management

=== College of Humanities and Social Sciences ===
- Department of Applied Foreign Languages
- Department of Human Resource Development
- Department of Culture and Creative Industries
- Center of Teacher Education
- Center of General Education

== Sister Universities ==
- Japan-The International University of Kagoshima
- United States- Tri-County Technical College

== See also ==
- List of universities in Taiwan
