= ACE Solar Racing =

Swiss student solar car racing team

- Base: Zürich, Switzerland; 47°22′0″N 8°33′0″E
- Founded: 2022
- Affiliation: ETH Zurich; FHNW; ZHAW
- Team number: 85
- Cars: Aletsch (2023); Silvretta (2025)
- Website: solarracing.ch

World Solar Challenge
- First entry: 2023
- Best result: 11th (2025)

iLumen European Solar Challenge
- First entry: 2024
- Best result: 8th (2026)

ACE Solar Racing is a student-led team based in Zürich, Switzerland, that designs and builds solar race cars to compete in the Bridgestone World Solar Challenge in Australia and the iLumen European Solar Challenge in Belgium. The team was founded in spring 2022 by six students from ETH Zurich and has since grown to more than 100 members, including students from the FHNW and ZHAW.

The team has built two cars. Its first, Aletsch, finished 12th at the 2023 World Solar Challenge and 13th at the 2024 European Solar Challenge. Its second, Silvretta, finished 11th at the 2025 World Solar Challenge and 8th in the Challenger Class at the 2026 European Solar Challenge.

== Solar cars ==
=== Aletsch ===
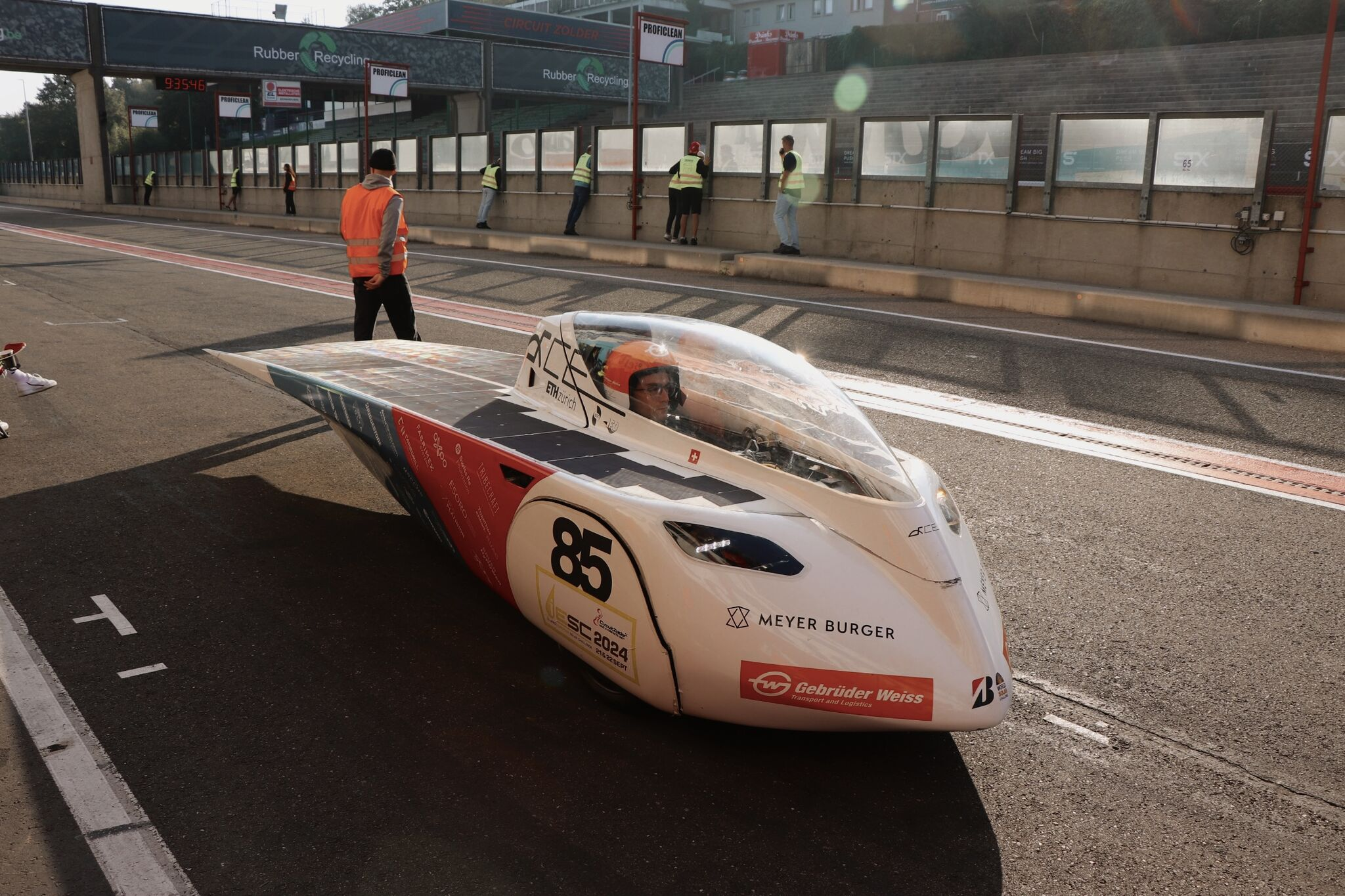
Aletsch in the pit lane of Circuit Zolder during the 2024 iLumen European Solar Challenge

Aletsch was the team's first vehicle and was built for the 2023 Bridgestone World Solar Challenge, where it competed in the Challenger Class. Development began at the start of the ETH Zurich academic year in September 2022 as part of a focus project, and the car was officially unveiled on 11 August 2023, less than eleven months later.

The single-seat car weighs 188 kilograms (414 lb) and has a top speed of 120 kilometres per hour (75 mph). Its silhouette is the result of a design that places as much of the solar array as possible behind the driver's canopy, reducing the area affected by the canopy's shadow. The canopy extends forward to the tip of the nose to reduce the formation of horseshoe vortices where it meets the solar deck.

In line with competition regulations, the car carries 4 square metres (43 sq ft) of monocrystalline silicon solar cells supplied by Meyer Burger, giving a peak output of around 1 kW. Energy from the array and from regenerative braking is stored in a 20-kilogram (44 lb) battery pack of 420 commercially available 18650 lithium-ion cells in a 35S12P configuration, with a capacity of around 5.1 kWh.

Aletsch has a monohull layout with two steered front wheels on double wishbone suspension and a single driven rear wheel, powered by a direct-drive hub motor on a trailing arm. Steering is cable-operated to keep the centre of gravity low. Safety features include a collapsible steering column, a four-point safety belt and a roll hoop; as required by the regulations, the chassis was designed to withstand accelerations of 5 g in all directions. The car's front wheel fairings use so-called wheel doors, which open to make room for the wheels at large steering angles and otherwise sit flush with the body, reducing frontal area and aerodynamic drag. A purpose-built DC-to-DC converter supplies the 12 V low-voltage system directly from the main battery, removing the need for a separate auxiliary battery. The on-board electronics communicate over a CAN bus.

=== Silvretta ===
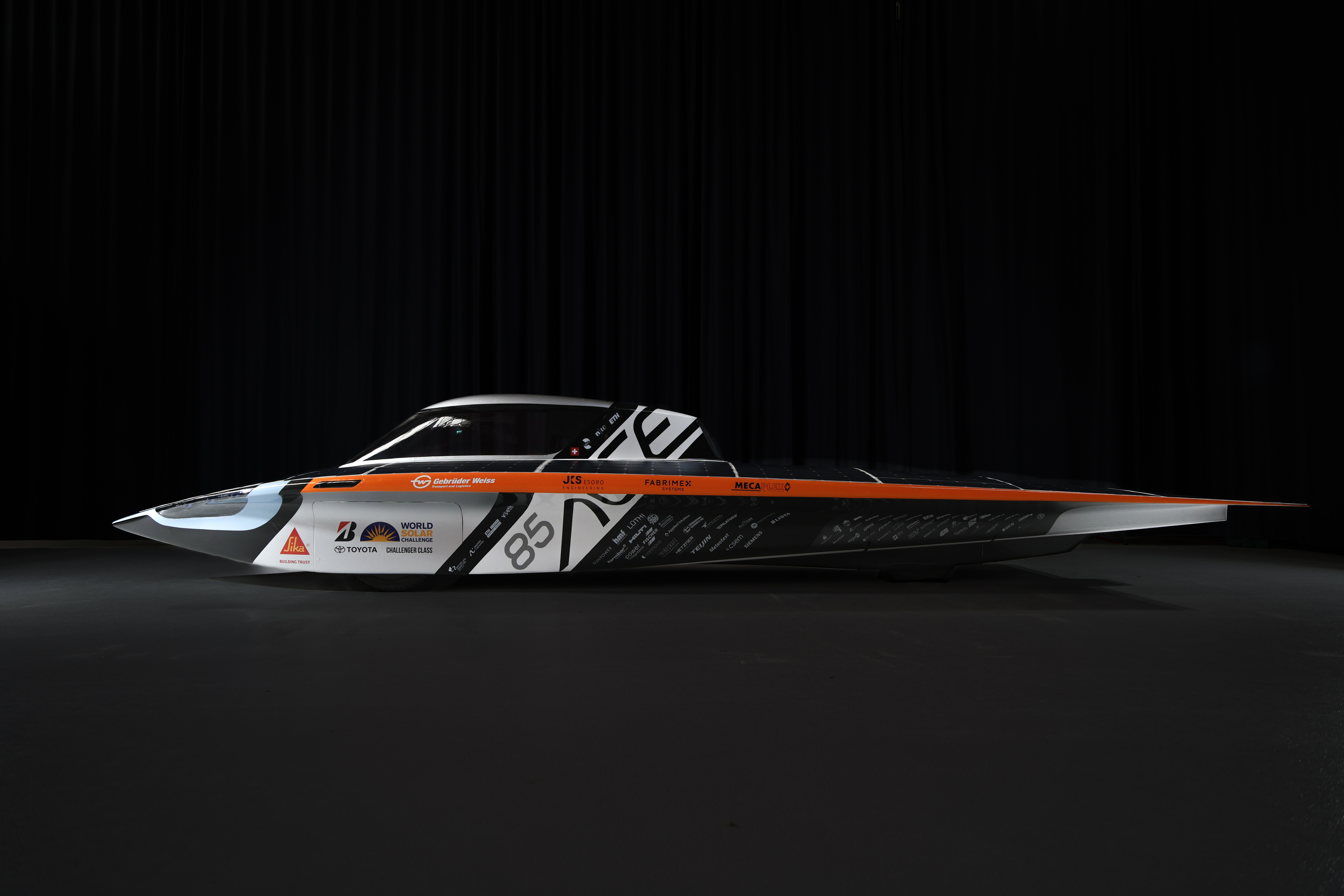
Silvretta, built for the 2025 Bridgestone World Solar Challenge

In May 2024 the Neue Zürcher Zeitung reported on the team's plans to build a new car for the 2025 World Solar Challenge.

The team unveiled Silvretta on 6 June 2025, after around eighteen months of development. Designed as an evolution of Aletsch, it focuses on the trade-off between aerodynamic efficiency and solar yield. The suspension and steering components are machined from high-strength aluminium, and the body is made primarily of carbon-fibre-reinforced polymer. The car is driven by a radial flux in-wheel motor and draws power from a 6-square-metre (65 sq ft) solar array and a 3 kWh battery. According to the team, its aerodynamic drag is comparable to that of a conventional car's side mirror.

== Race history ==
Results
Year	Event	Car	Class	Result	Race time / laps
2023	Bridgestone World Solar Challenge	Aletsch	Challenger	12th	49:03:38
2024	iLumen European Solar Challenge	Aletsch	Challenger	13th	163 laps
2025	Bridgestone World Solar Challenge	Silvretta	Challenger	11th	44:42:00
2026	iLumen European Solar Challenge	Silvretta	Challenger	8th	253 laps

=== 2023 World Solar Challenge ===
The team finished 12th in its debut at the 2023 Bridgestone World Solar Challenge, covering the 3,022-kilometre (1,878 mi) route from Darwin to Adelaide in six days with an official race time of 49 hours, 3 minutes and 38 seconds. It was the last team to reach the finish within the official time limit. pv magazine covered the team's debut, highlighting the car's monocrystalline silicon cells and lightweight composite construction.

=== 2024 iLumen European Solar Challenge ===
From 18 to 22 September 2024, the team raced Aletsch at the iLumen European Solar Challenge at Circuit Zolder in Belgium. Over the 24-hour race the car completed 163 laps of the 4.011-kilometre (2.492 mi) circuit, a total of about 654 kilometres (406 mi), with a fastest lap of 4:28.66. The team finished 13th.

=== 2025 World Solar Challenge ===
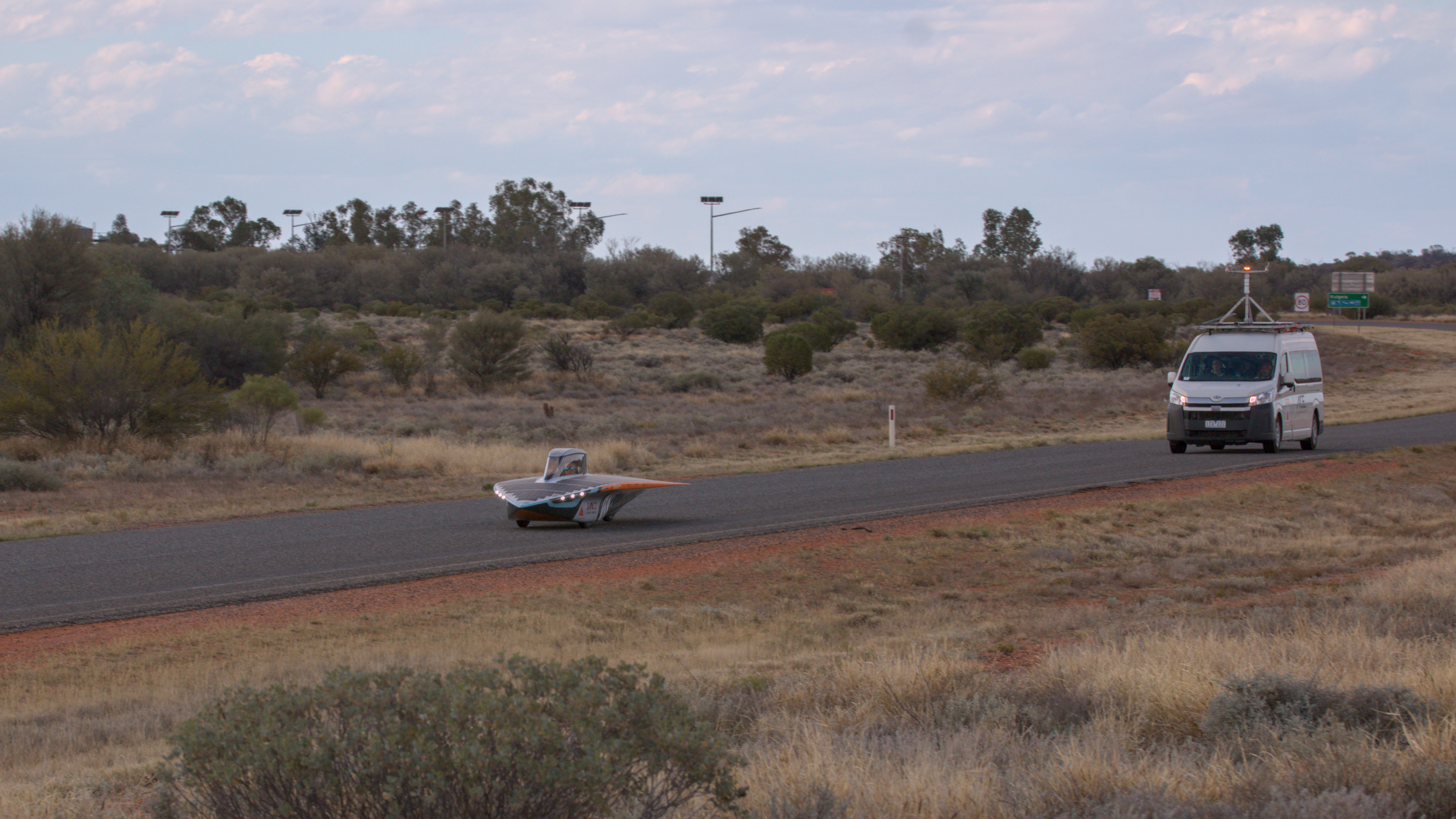
Silvretta near Kulgera during the 2025 World Solar Challenge

The team entered Silvretta in the Challenger Class. The car passed static scrutineering at the first attempt and set a dynamic scrutineering lap time of 2:14.65, an average speed of 76.73 kilometres per hour (47.68 mph).

The team started the race from ninth position. It spent the first night at the Dunmarra control stop, where it served its remaining control stop time before setting off on the Monday morning. On the Friday, the team was held up by a 45-minute weather-related race delay. It finished 11th, with a total race time of 44 hours and 42 minutes.

=== 2026 iLumen European Solar Challenge ===
Silvretta at Circuit Zolder during the 2026 iLumen European Solar Challenge

At the 2026 iLumen European Solar Challenge at Circuit Zolder, the team raced Silvretta in the Challenger Class. It completed 253 laps in the 24-hour race, set a fastest lap of 3:31.558 and finished 8th in the class.

The race was held in heavy rain and changing track conditions. At 16:44, Silvretta crashed at the Villeneuve chicane and rolled over; the roll hoop remained intact and the driver was unhurt. After repairs, the car returned to the track at 19:16, initially without its canopy. A replacement canopy was brought from Zürich and fitted at around 04:30, after which the car ran in its normal configuration until the end of the race. The team received the event's Spirit of the Event award.

== Sponsors ==
The team is funded largely by corporate sponsorship. Partners for the 2025 season included Gebrüder Weiss, Sika, Hilti, Pilatus Aircraft, LISTA, SunPower, Teijin, Pfeiffer Vacuum, Connova, Power Integrations and the Swiss Center for Electronics and Microtechnology (CSEM), along with a number of smaller Swiss engineering and manufacturing companies.

== See also ==
- List of solar car teams
- Solar car racing
- List of prototype solar-powered cars
