= Marco Schüpbach =

Swiss engineer

- Born: March 3, 1977 (age 48)
- Occupation: Engineer
- Employer: Emil Frey Racing
- Known for: Motorsports Engineer
- Title: Sporting Director

Marco Schüpbach (born 2 March 1977) is a Swiss Formula One and motorsports engineer. He is currently the Sporting Director for Emil Frey Racing, and has previously served as a race engineer for Sauber Motorsport.

== Career ==
Schüpbach studied mechanical engineering at the University of Applied Sciences and Arts Northwestern Switzerland in Muttenz. He began his motorsport career as a junior race engineer for Mücke Motorsport supporting the team in the German Formula 3 Championship. Schüpbach moved to Formula One in 2002, joining local Swiss team Sauber Motorsport as a Vehicle Dynamics Engineer before progressing to Performance Engineer, working closely with the race team to optimise car set-up and on-track performance. In this capacity he served as Performance Engineer to Robert Kubica from 2007 to 2009 and to Kamui Kobayashi during the 2010 season.

From 2011 he moved into a Race Engineer role, working with Sergio Pérez during the Mexican driver’s debut seasons, including a highly successful 2012 campaign in which the partnership achieved three podium finishes and came close to securing a race victory. He subsequently engineered Nico Hülkenberg in 2013 and Adrian Sutil in 2014, remaining part of Sauber’s race engineering group through a period of transition for the Hinwil-based team.

After leaving full-time Formula One responsibilities, Schüpbach continued his career in motorsport with Emil Frey Racing, where he has held a number of senior operational and engineering roles, including Head of Track Engineering and later Race Engineer and Simulator Developer. He is currently Team Manager and Sporting Director for the organisation’s DTM programme, alongside responsibility for simulator activities.
