= List of prototype solar-powered cars =

This list of prototype solar cars comprises multiperson, relatively practical vehicles powered completely or significantly by solar cells (panels or arrays, mounted on the vehicle) which convert sunlight into electricity to drive electric motors while the vehicle is in motion and have a homologation for public streets.

== Australia ==
=== Sunswift V (eVe) ===
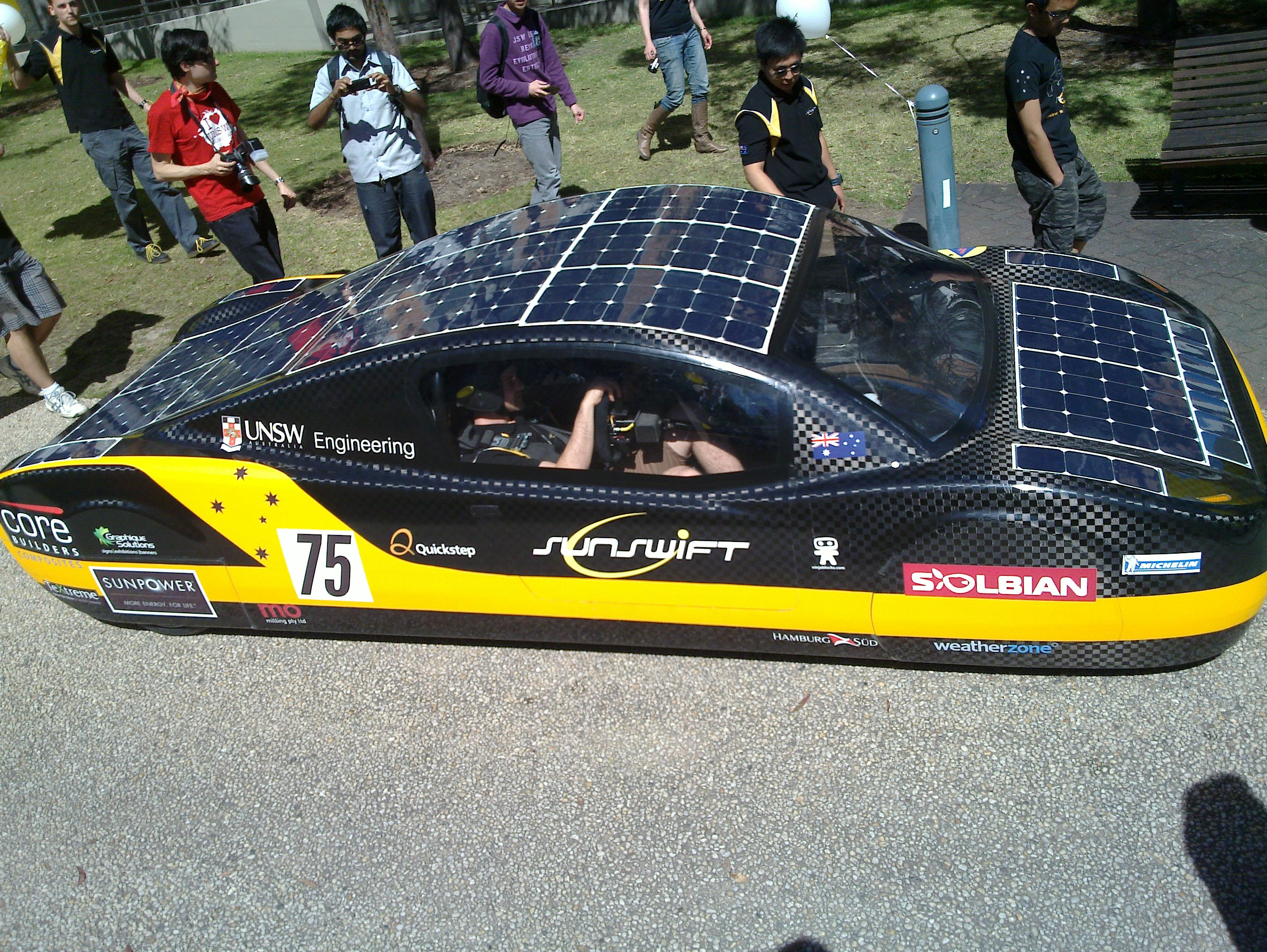
The Sunswift V (eVe) with team

The Sunswift V (aka "eVe") from the University of New South Wales was built for the 2013 & 2015 World Solar Challenge.

=== Solar Spirit 3 ===
The "Solar Spirit 3" with 3 seats was built by TAFE South Australia for the 2011 World Solar Challenge.

== Brazil ==
=== e.coTech Solar version ===
The "e.coTech" is a normal electric car developed by "HiTech Electric" and is sold only to small and medium-sized businesses. In 2017, the solar version of "e.coTech" was announced and presented to the public in 2018.

== Canada ==
=== Schulich Delta ===
The "Schulich Delta" from the University of Calgary was built for the 2013 World Solar Challenge.

== China ==
=== Cars without name ===
The handicraft enthusiast "Chen Shungui" developed 2 prototypes between 2002 and 2010.

== Germany ==
=== Hochschule Bochum: Open World ===
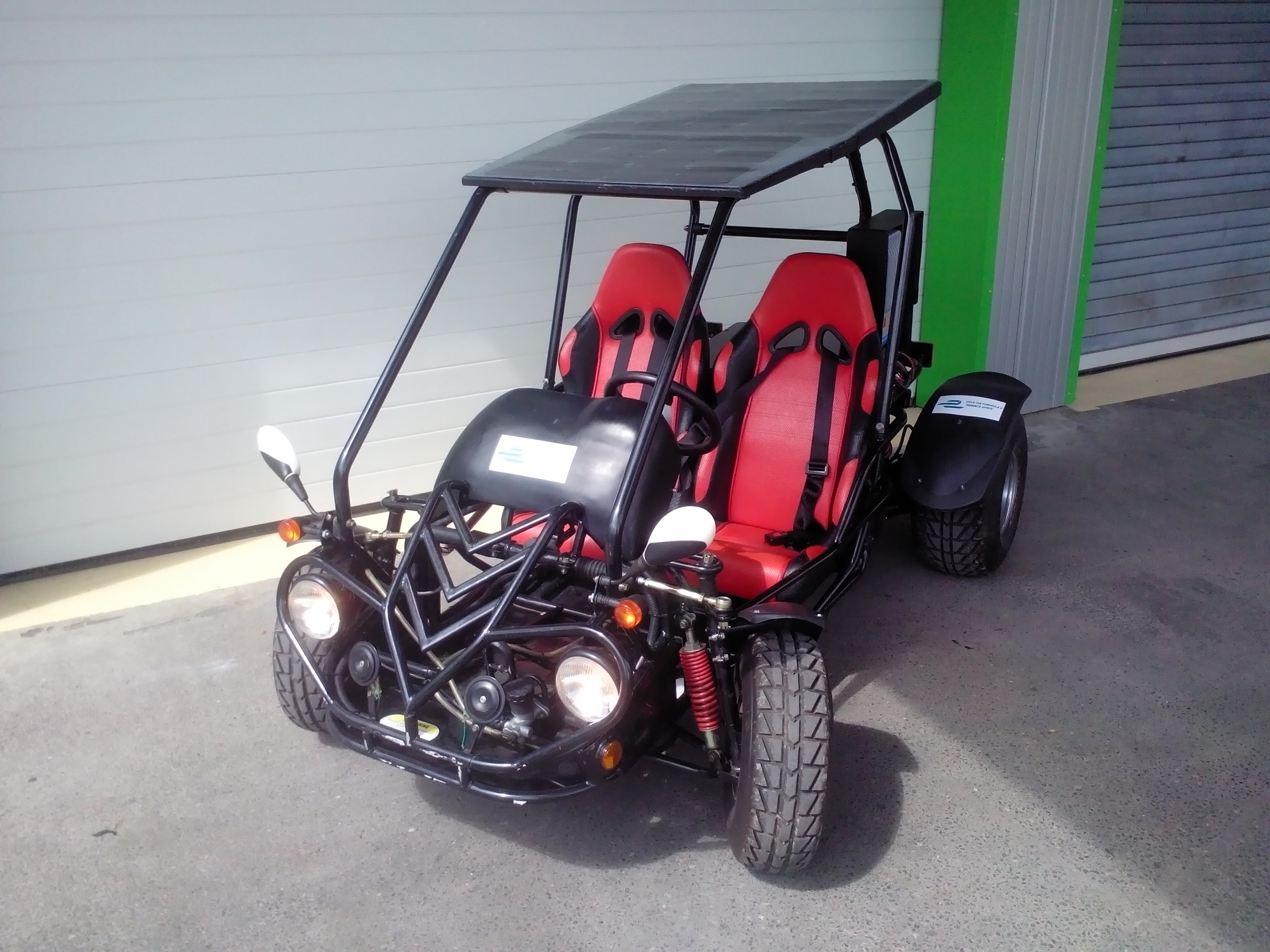
University Bochum: Open World

The solar vehicle was built in 2015 from the "Hochschule Bochum" to cross the desert of Tanami in Australia. Range with fully charged accumulator is 50 kilometers. The car have a solar roof with 160 Wp and in a box below the roof (not on the picture) 1943 Wp (!) solar panels for extension during driving breaks.

=== PowerCore SunCruiser ===
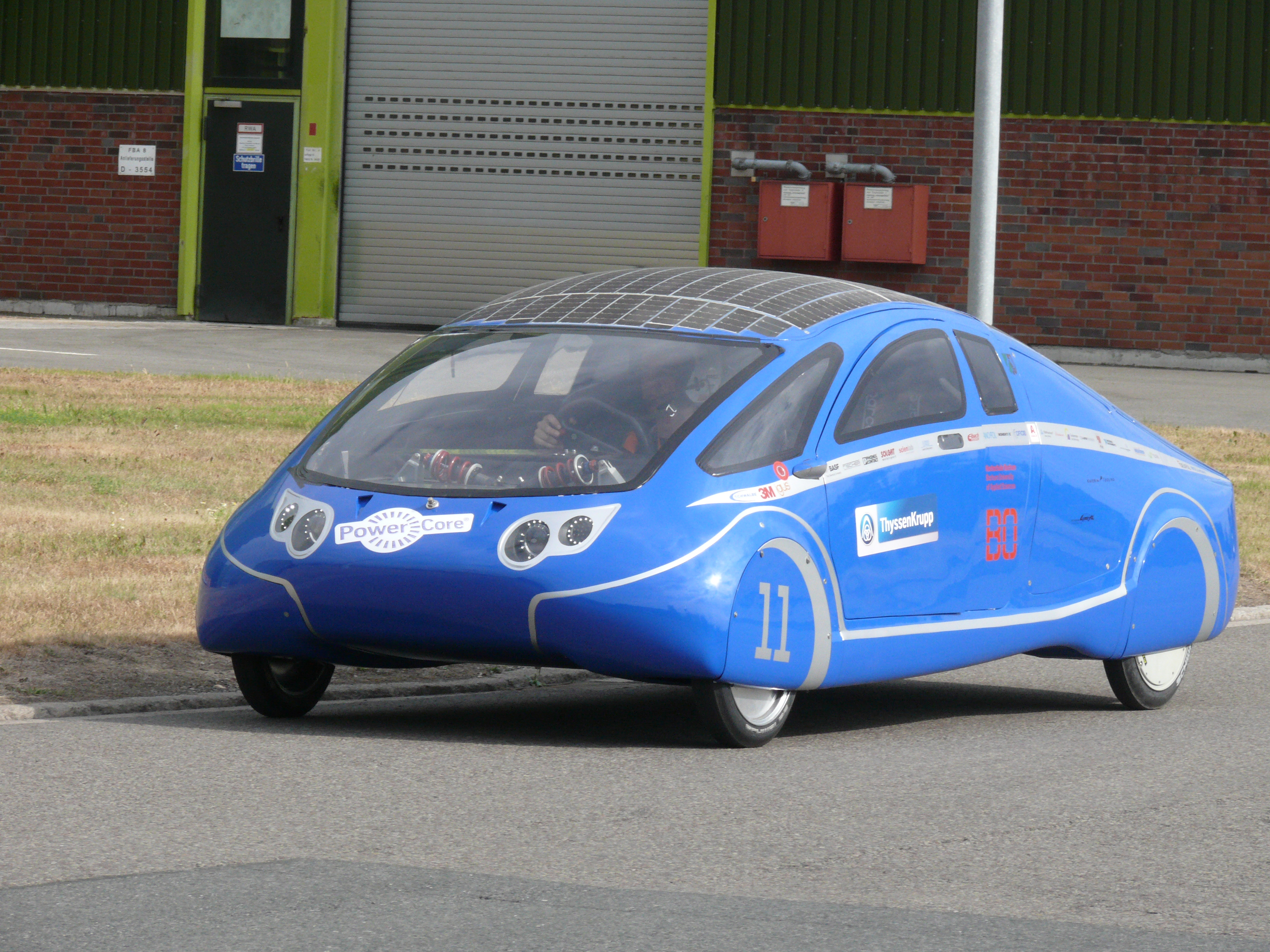
The "PowerCore SunCruiser"

The "PowerCore SunCruiser" with 3 seats was built in 2013 by "Hochschule Bochum". Maximum Power created on his solar roof is 833 Wp. Car is equipped with 4 wheel hub electric engines. Participant on the World Solar Challenge 2013.

=== Sion ===
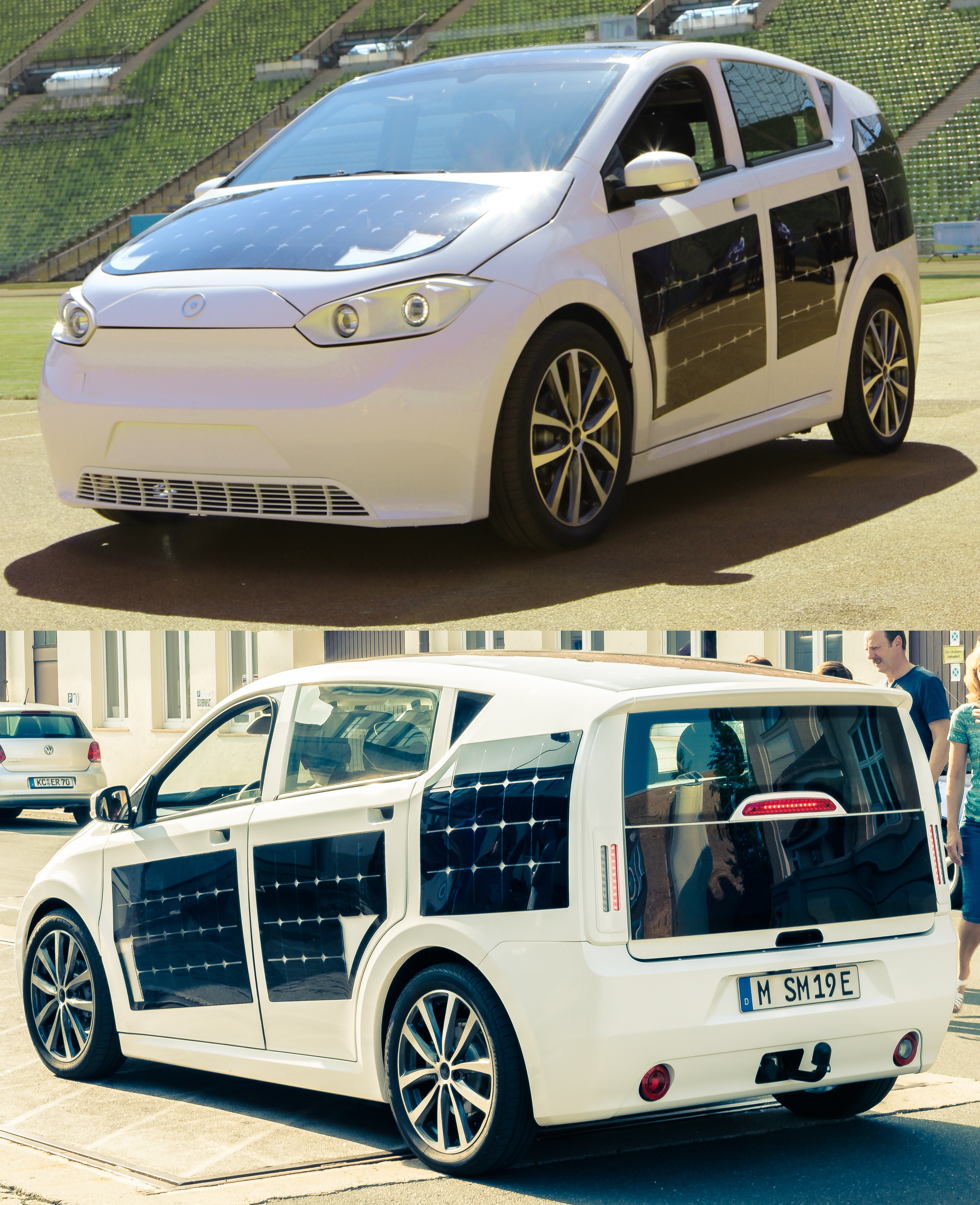
Sono Sion prototype in 2017

The Sion model from Sono Motors was presented to the public in July 2016. Two prototypes were financed by crowdfunding and were available for test drives in August 2017. The price will be EUR 16,000,- plus the battery you can rent or buy (<EUR 4.000, -). Pre-orders are available through the website of Sono Motors. Delivery is scheduled to start in the 3rd quarter of 2019.

The car has 5 doors, an 80 kW engine with a maximum speed of 140 km/h, is rechargeable with AC power (3.7 kW or 22 kW) and direct current (50 kW). The battery will have a realistic range of 250 km. The solar cells (1.208 Wp) integrated into the car body charge the battery so that, in good sunshine, up to 30 km of additional range per day are possible. It is possible to use the current of the battery in the Sion to operate electrical devices or to charge other electric cars.

The workshop manual for the Sion including the CAD data of all spare parts for 3D printers or CNC Milling will be public, so that reasonable repair costs are to be expected. The owner of the vehicle can offer other people a power supply (power-sharing) or a ride-in (ridesharing) or rent his car (car sharing).

=== SolarWorld GT ===
The 2-seater "SolarWorld GT" was built 2011 by "Hochschule Bochum" with 2 wheel hub electric engines in the front wheels. After the participation at the 2011 World Solar Challenge, the car and his team did the first full autarky world circumnavigation (10/2011-12/2012). This record was admitted by Guinness World Records. On the roof of the car are 3 m^{2} solar cells and in the trunk additional 3 m^{2} which are used during driving breaks. Maximum power creation of all solar cells is 1340Wp. More technical data can be found here:.

=== ThyssenKrupp SunRiser ===
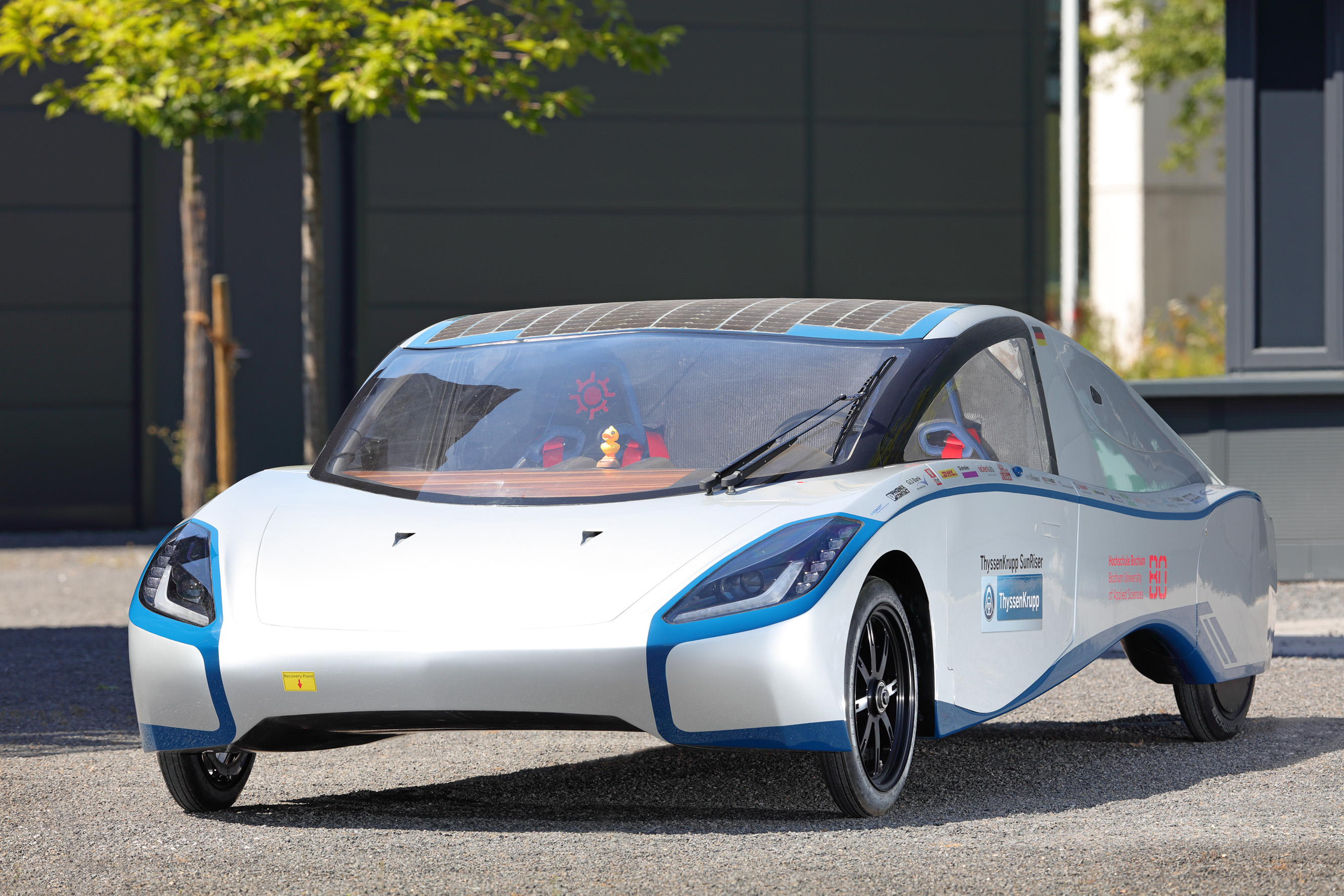
ThyssenKrupp SunRiser

"The "PowerCore SunCruiser" with two seats was built by "Hochschule Bochum" for the 2015 World Solar Challenge. Maximum Power created on its 3 m^{2} solar roof is 870 Wp. Car is equipped with 2 wheel hub electric engines and comfort electronics. Top speed is 120 km/h. Range with solar charging only is up to 600 kilometers per day. Range with fully charged accumulator (14,8 kWh) is up to 1100 kilometers.

== India ==
=== SolarMobil ===
The team SolarMobil from the Manipal University (MAHE) built a prototype 2-seater solar passenger car called "SERVe" in 2015.

=== Electro-X India ===
Team Electro-X of engineering students from Galgotias University, developed a 2-seater solar powered Electric car.

=== Vayve Mobility ===
Developed the Vayve EVA solar-powered electric car.

== Italy ==
=== P-Mob ===
With an EU - project led by Fiat (May 2010 - April 2013) a complete solar car with 3 seats was developed. This small car has four wheel drive. Range with solar charging only is 20 kilometers per day. Range with fully charged accumulator is 120 kilometers.

=== Archimede ===
Developed and built in Sicily by Futuro Solare Association.

=== Emilia 4 ===
Developed and built in Emilia Romagna in 2018 by the University of Bologna, the Onda Solare Association and several industrial partners, Emilia 4 is a 4.6 meter long, 1.8 meter wide and 1.2 meter high 4 seats vehicle. It is equipped with a 5 square meter photovoltaic roof, made of 362 silicon cells, with a nominal power of 1200W. The car won the American Solar Challenge 2018 in the Multi-Occupant Vehicle (MOV) category.

== Japan ==
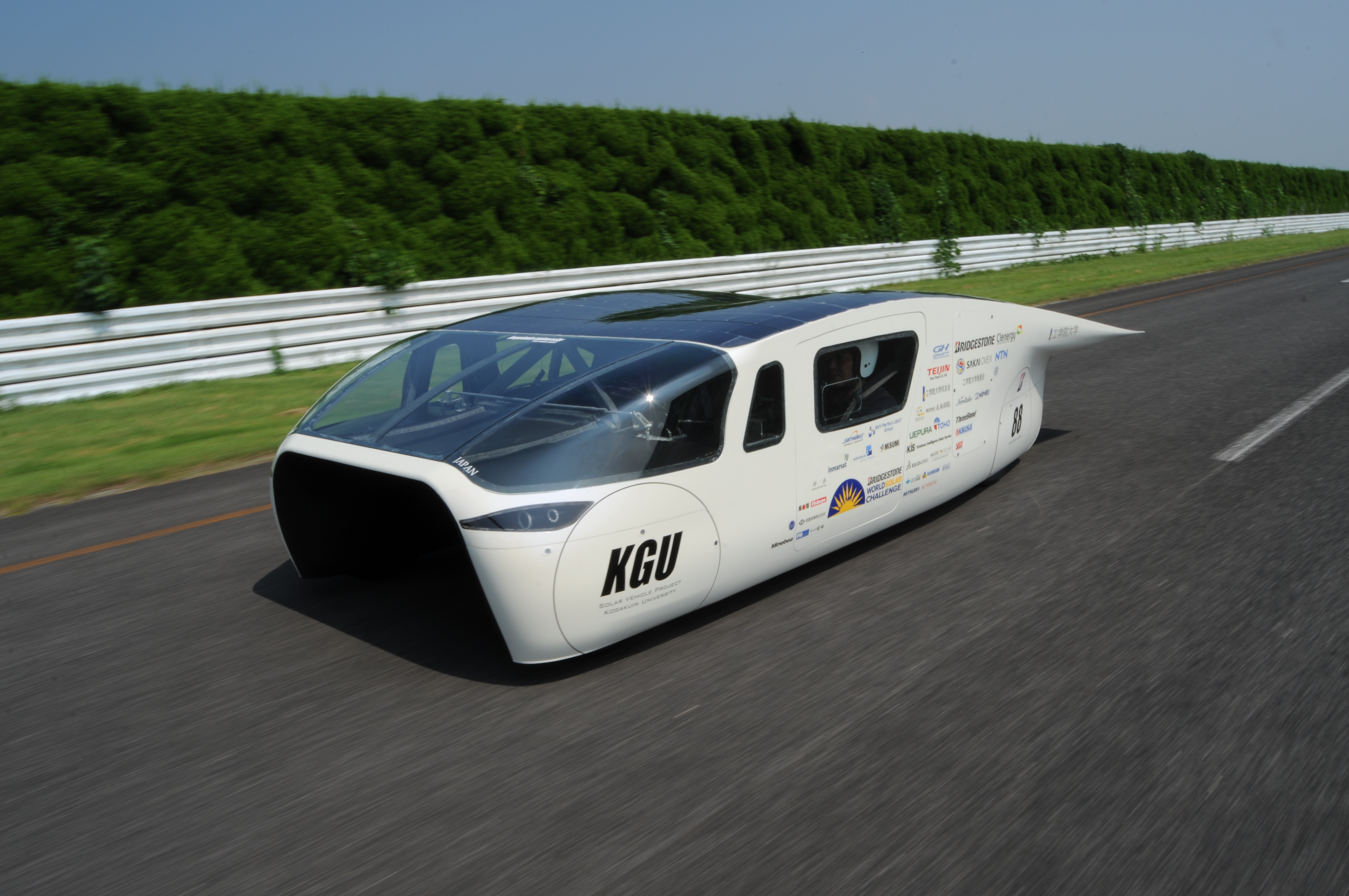
Japan's Kogakuin University's OWL car took 2nd place in the Cruiser class of the 2015 World Solar Challenge.

=== Kaiton II ===
The "KAITON II" from the "Goko High School" was built for the 2013 World Solar Challenge.

=== OWL ===
"OWL" was built for the 2015 World Solar Challenge in the Cruiser class by Kogakuin University.

== Monaco ==
=== Venturi Astrolab ===
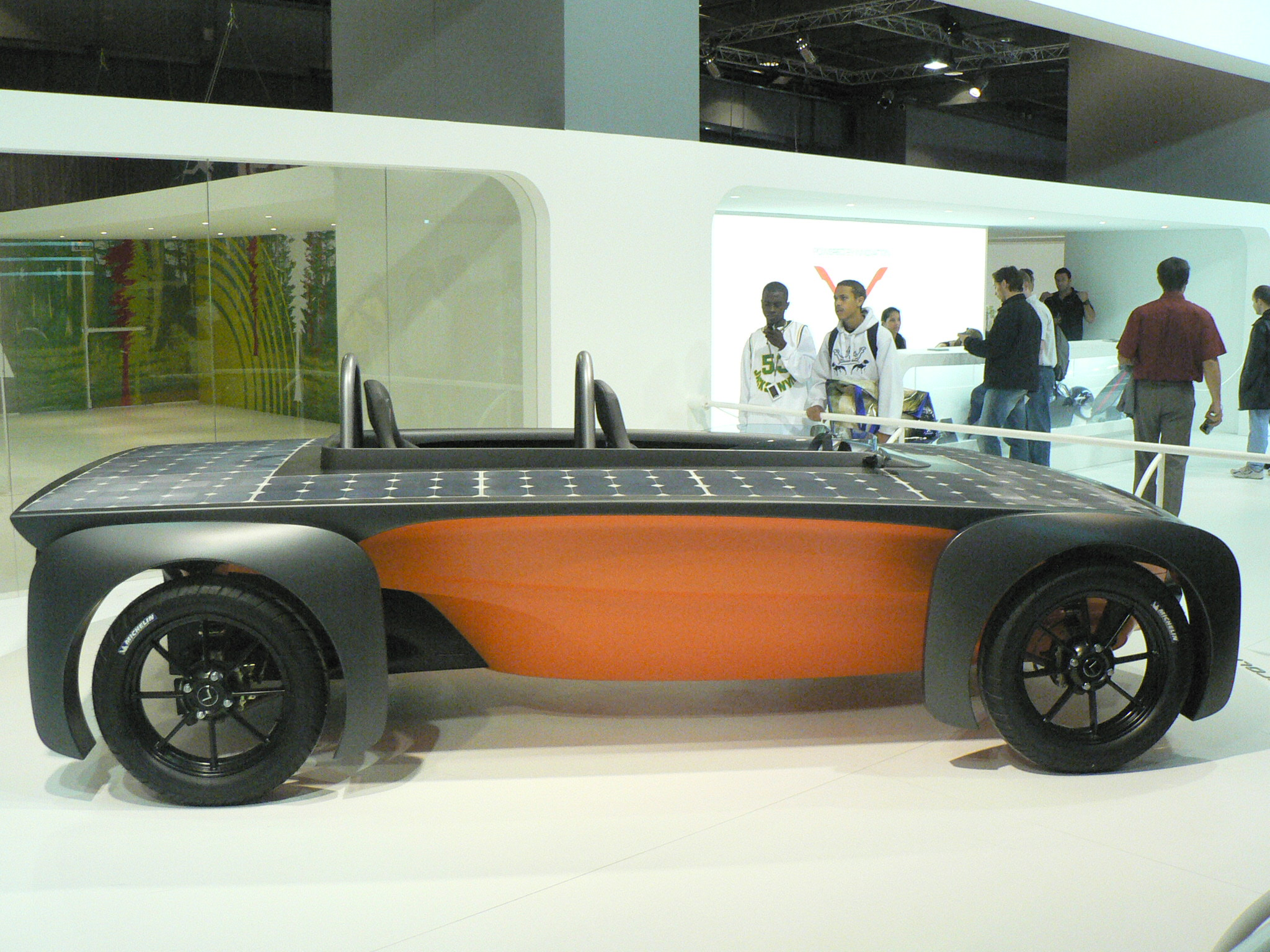
Venturi Astrolab

Venturi Automobiles has built the open 2-seater "Astrolab" since 2006. With solar charging only, its range is 18 kilometers per day. Its range with the accumulator fully charged is 110 kilometers. It has a top speed of 120 km/h.

=== Venturi Eclectic ===
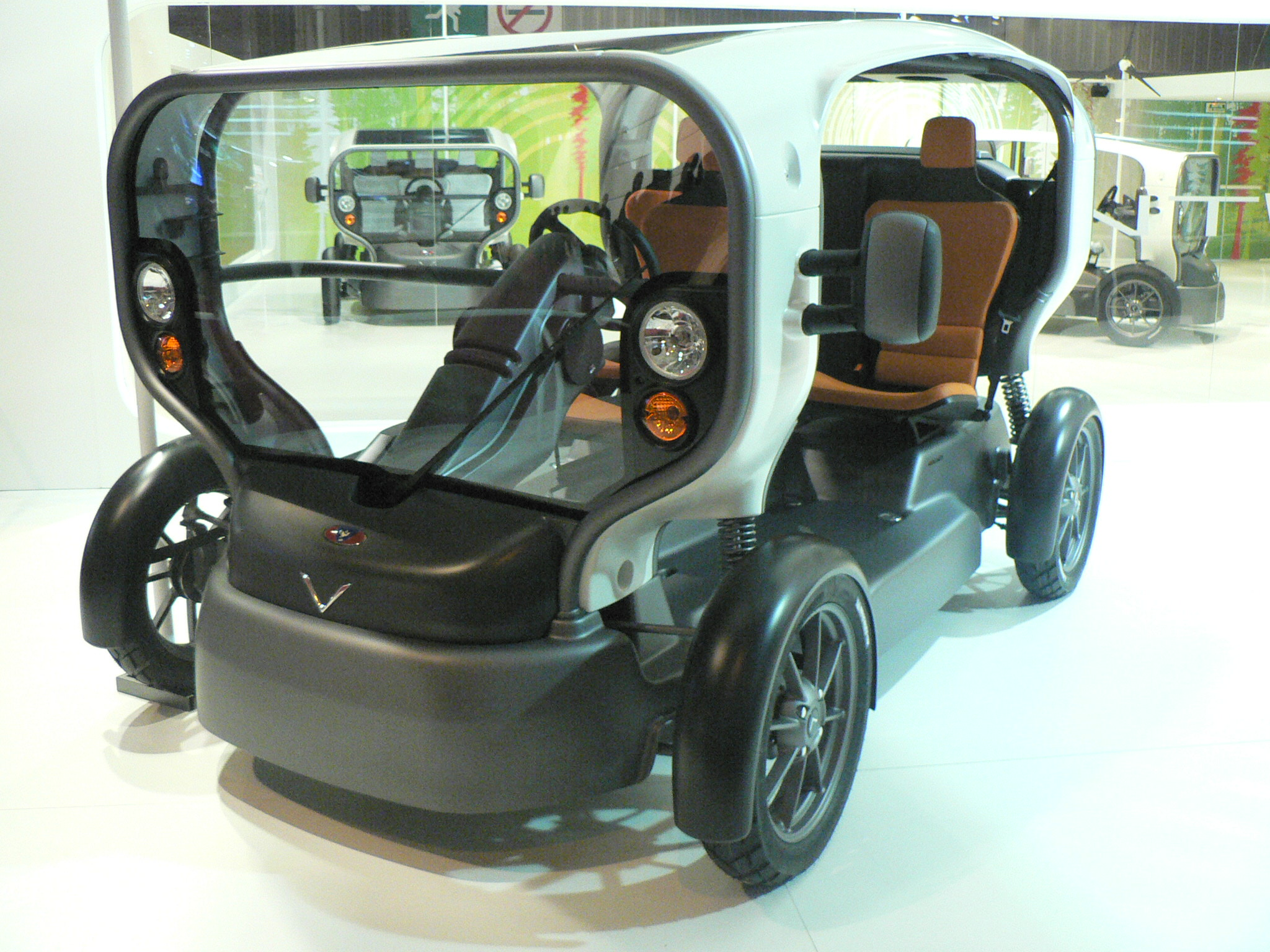
Venturi Eclectic

Venturi Automobiles designed the flanking seating, open-sided 3-seater "Eclectic" as a prototype in 2006. Its range with solar charging only is 7 kilometers per day. Fully charged, its accumulator gives a range of 50 kilometers. The car has a top speed 50 km/h. Its price was 'middle of the road' as announced, but serial production never started. There is also a small electric car with the name "Eclectic 2.0" from the same company.

== The Netherlands ==
=== Lightyear One ===
The 5-seater solar car Lightyear One is built by the company Lightyear, whose founder and CEO Lex Hoefsloot has already won the World Solar Challenge several times, e.g. in 2013 with the car "Stella" (Solar Team Eindhoven, Technical University Eindhoven). The car was scheduled to go into production in 2021. In September 2021, Lightyear was reported to have raised $110 million to bring the vehicle to production. It was produced for 2 months from December 2022 through January 2023.

=== Stella ===
The 4-seater "Stella" was built for the 2013 World Solar Challenge by Eindhoven University. It was the winner in its class, and went on to win the crunchies award.

=== Stella Lux ===
The 4-seater "Stella Lux" was built as successor of Stella for the 2015 World Solar Challenge by Eindhoven University. It was the winner in its class again. With a top speed of 125 km/h and a European range of 1000 kilometers it is a substantial achievement with respect to common electric vehicles.

=== Stella Vie ===
In 2017 the Eindhoven team have built a new car for the World Solar Challenge, called Stella Vie, featuring five instead of four seats. By its introduction, this car was the most efficient family car ever built. More efficient than its predecessors due to its light weight and aerodynamic form and efficient enough to win the Cruiser Class of the World Solar Challenge for the third consecutive time with a big lead on the competition.

=== Squad Solar ===
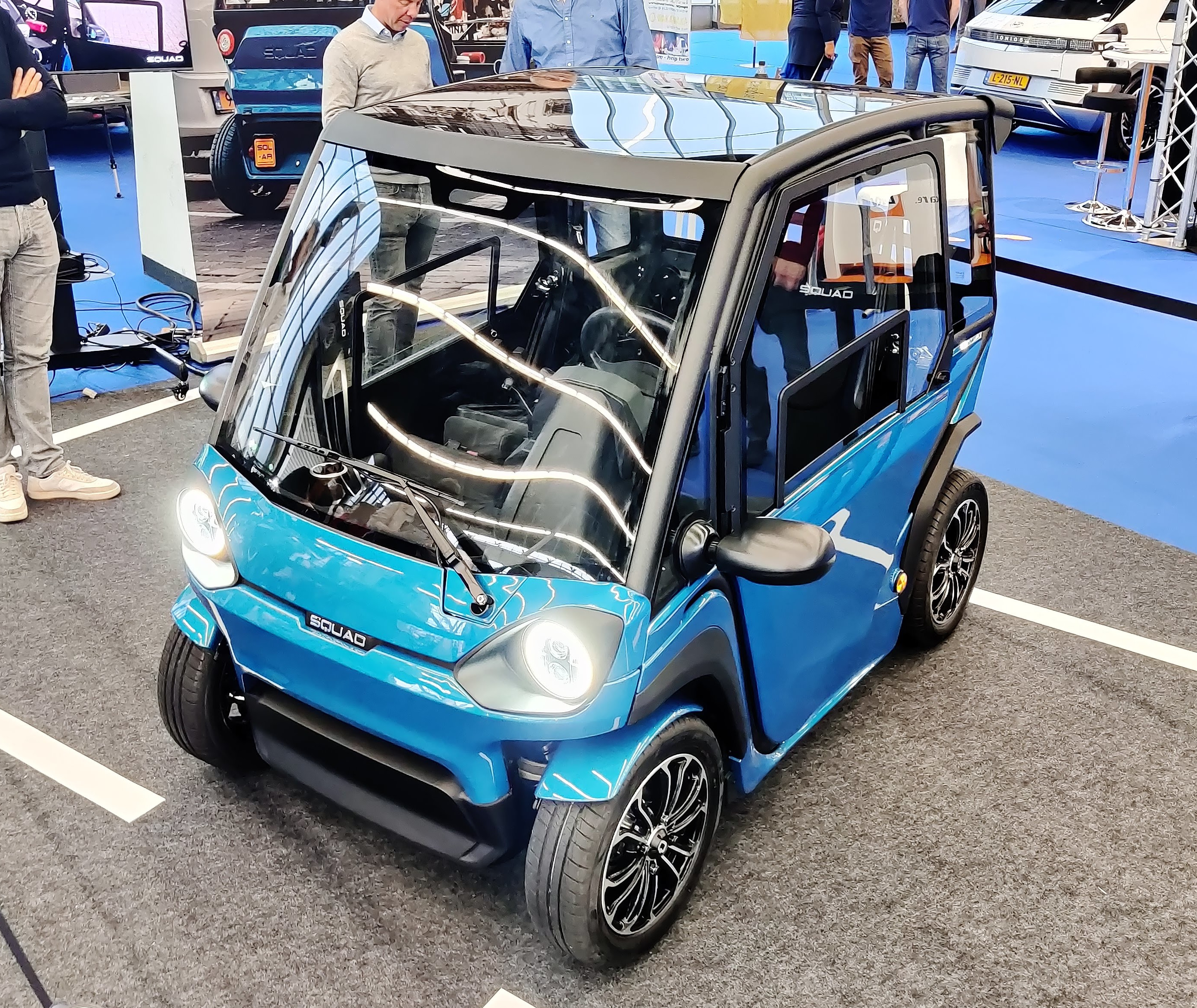
Squad Solar

Squad Solar is a neighborhood electric vehicle or microcar that has a solar panel on top to make it a solar car.

=== Twente One ===
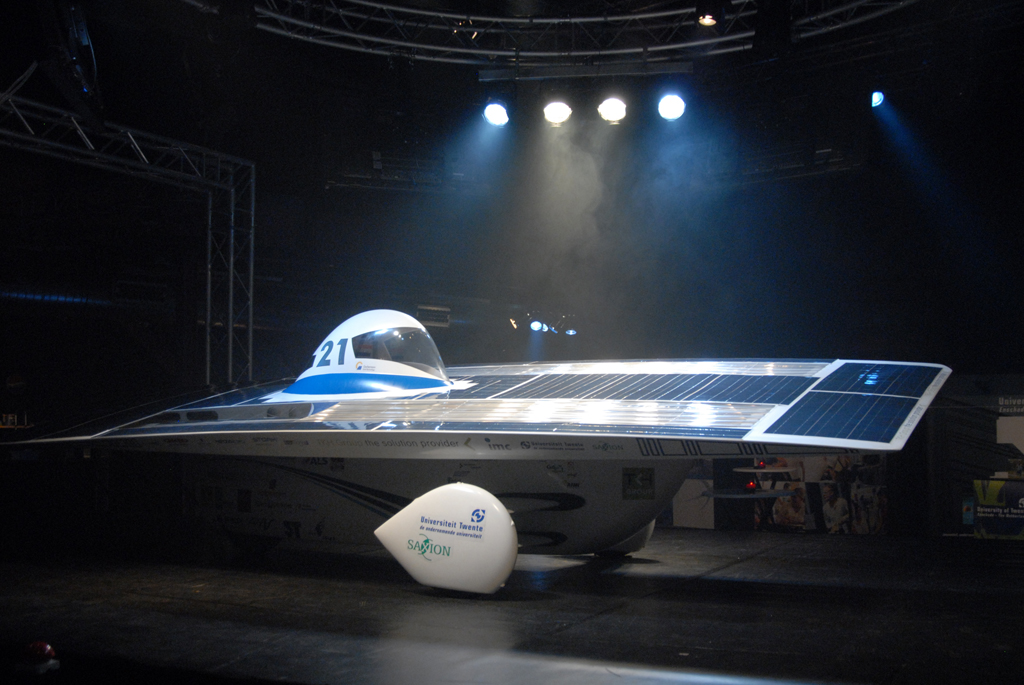
Twente One

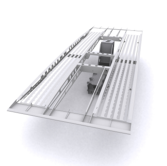
chassis of Twente One

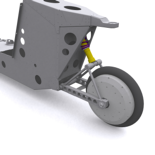
Driving wheel of Twente One

The Twente One is the second solar car developed by the University of Twente and Saxion University (at Enschede, Deventer and Apeldoorn) in 2007, and succeeds the SolUTra. It was designed to participate in the 2007 World Solar Challenge.

Its main innovations were a pivoting solar screen that follows the angle of the sun, and a system of Fresnel lenses that focus the sunlight onto a solar panel with a system to adjust the panel so that the maximum amount of light from the lenses shines on the individual solar cells.

The Twente One came in on the fifth place in the 2007 World solar Challenge.

==== Specifications ====
Length	5000mm
Width	1800mm
Height	1400mm
Weight (excluding Driver)	<230 kg
Number of wheels	3
Characteristics	Pivoting solar panel & lens system with Fresnel lenses and movable solar cells
Top-speed	120 km/h
Solar cells	2073 Gallium-Arsenide Triple Junction, area 6m²
Efficiency of solar cells	>27%
Motor	In-Wheel Direct Drive Electric Motor NGM/CSIRO 95%-99%
Battery	30 kg Lithium Polymer
Control	Steering wheel from aluminium tube with a width like a CD-box, and with quick-release
Bodywork	Carbon fibre sandwich construction
Chassis	Box-construction from aluminium plate-work, connected through high quality aluminium milled parts, roller-bars from chrome-molybdenum-steel
Fore-wheel suspension	Double A-arm construction from chrome-molybdenum-steel, horizontal racing shock absorbers, lightweight aluminium rims, ceramic bearings
Hind-wheel suspension	Trailing-arm construction of chrome-molybdenum-steel
Tires	Bridgestone/Maxxis radial 14 inch (slicks)
Brakes	Brake-discs with aerospace braking-hoses in the front, regenerative braking in the back
Rolling friction	one tenth that of a normal car
Air friction	one fifth that of a normal car
Telemetry	Wireless connection with following car, car transmits about 200 measuring signals
Crew	One team-member

== New Zealand ==
=== UltraCommuter ===
The "UltraCommuter" from the University of Waikato was built for the 2013 World Solar Challenge.

== Pakistan ==
=== ECO1, ECO1GL and ECO3GL ===
ECO1, ECO1GL and ECO3GL are built by a technology enthusiast and entrepreneur Muhammad Aslam Azaad. Built in March 2014.

== Romania ==
=== Solar Bear ===
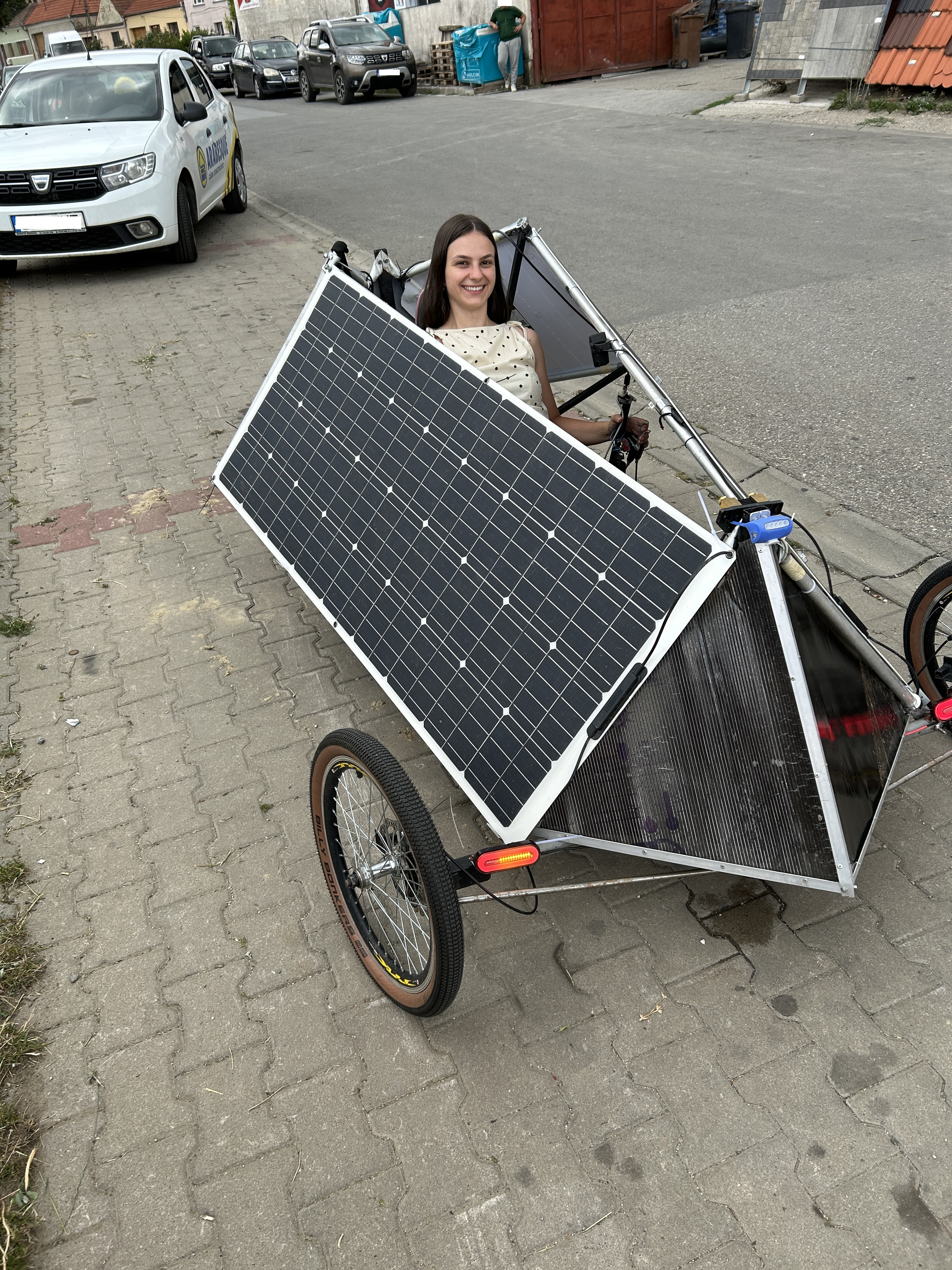
Solar Bear is an open source solar vehicle

Solar Bear is a hybrid Sun/muscle-powered trike. It was built in 2025-2026. The motor is small (250W) and can be powered directly from solar panels on sunny days. The entire vehicle is light and can be pedaled when there is no Sun or during cloudy days. The project is open source under an MIT license.

== Slovenia ==
=== Metron 7 ===
A Mazda 5 was converted to an electric car named Metron 7 by Andrej Pecjak and his Metron team and in 2014 permitted for public use. Range with solar charging (160 Watt) is a few kilometers per day. Range with fully charged accumulator is 824 ! kilometers, proved from Berlin to Karlsruhe and through cities with average speed 72 km/h in June 2016.

=== Superpiki ===
The project "Yuneec & Metron" convert a Smart Roadster to an electric car with 80 Wp solar panel in 2011. Range with solar charging only is a few kilometers per day. Range with fully charged accumulator is 160 kilometers.

== Switzerland ==
=== CateCar ===
In 2017 CateCar Industries presented the prototype "Dragonfly", which has the following characteristics: 4-seater, lightweight, small, renewable and solar powered. The Dragonfly is a 560 kg vehicle certified in M1, with a cabin in flax, a solar roof, an aspirator of fine particles capturing them around the clock. Unfortunately, the development has not led to a production-ready vehicle, jet. On the website and in the media there are no further news since 2017.

=== Icare ===
The project "Icare" build a Twike (Hybrid: muscular strength + electric engine) with an additional solar trailer (1800 Wp) and a small wind generator (diameter 1,8 m). With that vehicle they circumnavigate the world in 2010/11.

=== Solar Taxi ===
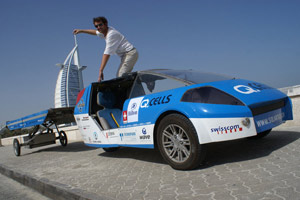
Palmer in his "Solartaxi"

This vehicle circumnavigate the world 2007/08 with "Lois Palmer" as driver. Energy was delivered to 50% from the solar trailer (6 m^{2}) and to 50% from the power grid (which was indirectly produced by a solar installation in Switzerland). Power consumption: 8 kWh / 100 km.

=== Aletsch ===
In 2023, the solar car Aletsch, developed by a team of 40 students from ETH Zurich known as aCentauri Solar Racing, participated in the Bridgestone World Solar Challenge. Aletsch, weighing 188 kilograms and capable of reaching speeds up to 120 km/h, was engineered over the course of a year to endure the extreme conditions of the race, including temperatures of up to 50°C, rough road surfaces, and strong crosswinds. Despite being first-time entrants, the ETH Zurich team completed the race and secured 12th place overall. The project aimed not only at competitive performance but also at promoting innovation and sustainability in electric vehicle design.

== Taiwan ==
=== Apollo Solar Cruiser Car ===
The "Apollo Solar Car Team" from National Kaohsiung University of Applied Sciences build a solar car for the 2013 World Solar Challenge.

== United States ==
=== Aptera ===
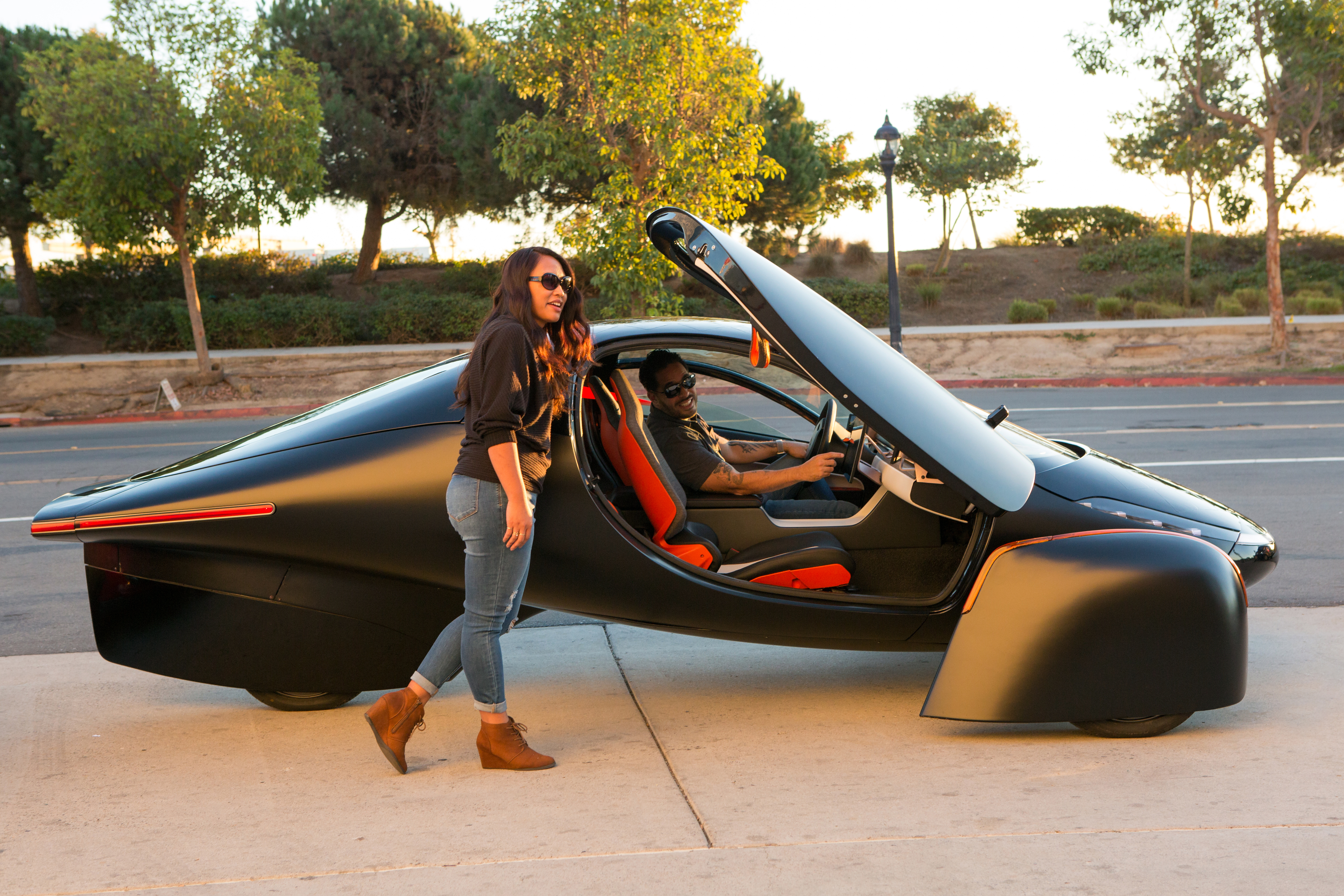
First prototype of the Aptera solar powered EV

The Aptera solar EV prototype from Aptera Motors was shown and launched December, 2020. As of January 2023, first customer availability is expected in 2026.

=== Daedalus ===
"Daedalus" of the University of Minnesota was built in 2013 for the World Solar Challenge. It is currently on display at the PTC world headquarters in Boston, MA.

=== Eos ===
"Eos" of the University of Minnesota was built in 2015 for the World Solar Challenge and the 2016 American Solar Challenge.
