= SolarMobil Manipal =

SolarMobil Manipal is the solar racing student team of Manipal University in Manipal, India. The team, founded in 2011, is the third Indian solar car team and the first Indian team to build a passenger solar car. Since its founding, Team SolarMobil has built six cars. These include "Freyr-1" (a single seater solar race car), "SERVe" (India's first student-built solar EV), "SM-S1" (India's "first four-seater family solar passenger car"), "SM-S2" (solar racing cruiser built for the South African Solar Challenge), "Zenith" (solar racing challenger built for the World Solar Challenge), and "Heliark" (built for the Solar Electric Vehicle Championship).

== Team ==
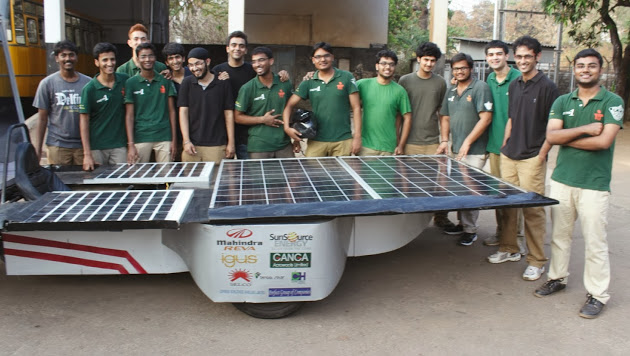
Members of the student team in 2015

The team, first formed in 2011, primarily consists of undergraduate students from various disciplines of engineering at Manipal Institute of Technology, and they receive support from the faculty of Manipal Institute of Technology. The team has also been supported by Tata Power Solar, Lotus Cars, Altair Engineering, Coca-Cola, State Bank of India and other corporate partners.

== Projects ==
Between 2011 and 2024, the team had developed six vehicles: Freyr-1, SERVe, SM-S1, SM-S2, Zenith, and Heliark. As of 2026, the team were engaged in research and development for a seventh upcoming vehicle, that is planned to be built in accordance with the World Solar Challenge rulebook.

=== Freyr-1 ===
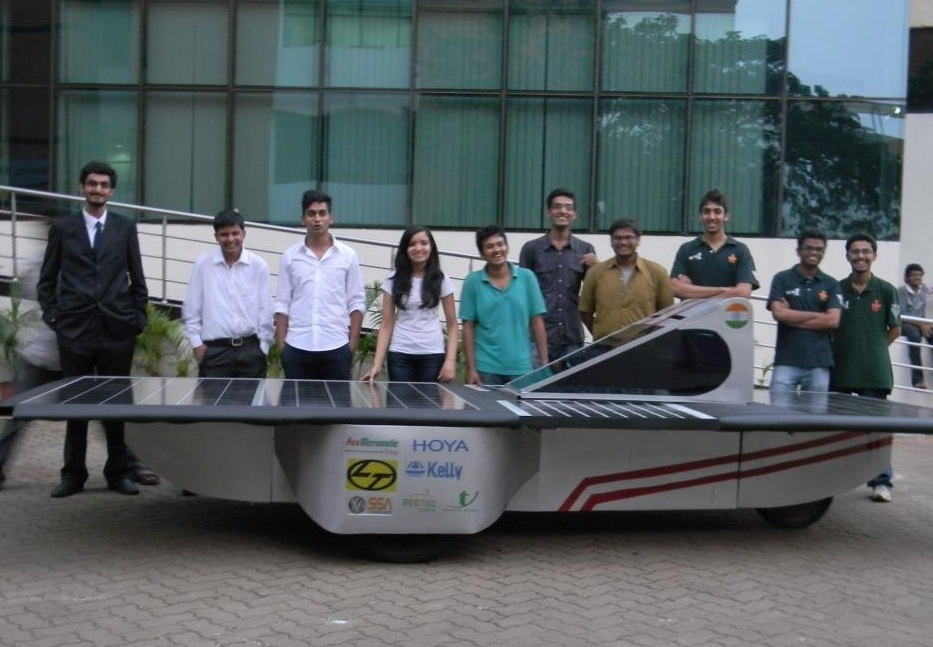
Freyr-1

Freyr-1, SolarMobil's first car, was completed in 2011. Freyr-1 is a single seater, three wheeler solar racing car. It featured a lightweight space-frame chassis, a custom-made suspension system and had the ability to drive directly on solar power using a high-power-efficiency drive train. It was designed by be fuel-free and produce zero emissions and zero noise pollution. The car was built with AISI 4130 Chromoly steel chassis and a lightweight fibre-reinforced plastic body. The solar panels, with a 6m^{2} area, were installed on the top of the car. The car, which was designed to adhere to World Solar Challenge specifications, belongs to the 'Adventure Class' category of solar vehicles.

=== SERVe ===
SERVe (Solar Electric Road Vehicle) was designed and built in 2015 by a group of approximately 27 students. It is a two-seat, four-wheel solar electric passenger car. The top is covered by a curved solar panel which powers the battery pack which, in turn, runs the motor. The solar car is reportedly capable of a top speed of 60 km/h and has a range of about 150 km. It was built with AISI 4130 Chromoly steel chassis. The body was made with lightweight glass fibre-reinforced plastic. It has an aerodynamic design obtained from the cut section of a tear drop. The car's solar panels cover an area of 6m2.

With SERVe, SolarMobil entered several competitions, and was the winner of QuEST Global's annual pan-India innovation contest – QuEST Ingenium 2015. Among the shortlisted 10 teams, SolarMobil was adjudged as the winning team. Besides a cash prize, SolarMobil team members were sponsored by Airbus to fly to Europe on a facility tour of its Stade & Bremen facility in Germany. SERVe was also awarded a third-place prize at CII India Innovation Challenge in 2014.

=== SM-S1 ===
SolarMobil Series-1, dubbed SM-S1, was the third car developed by the team. It seats four in a 2x2 arrangement and has a single-charge range of 160 km. The car uses a hybrid chassis consisting of a ladder and spaceframe chassis. The material used for the chassis is AISI 1018 steel and the body was made of glass fibre reinforced composite. The size of the solar array is 4.5m2. The solar panels were provided to the team by Tata Solar. It houses a 19 kwh battery pack that was manufactured in-house using Li-ion cells. The car's single-speed gearbox is linked to two AC motors via drive shafts. The car is a front wheel drive and the suspension systems and hand brake systems were developed in-house and manufactured by the students themselves. The main braking system is hydraulic and uses Wilwood four piston callipers.
