= Squad Solar =

Solar electric motor vehicle

Squad
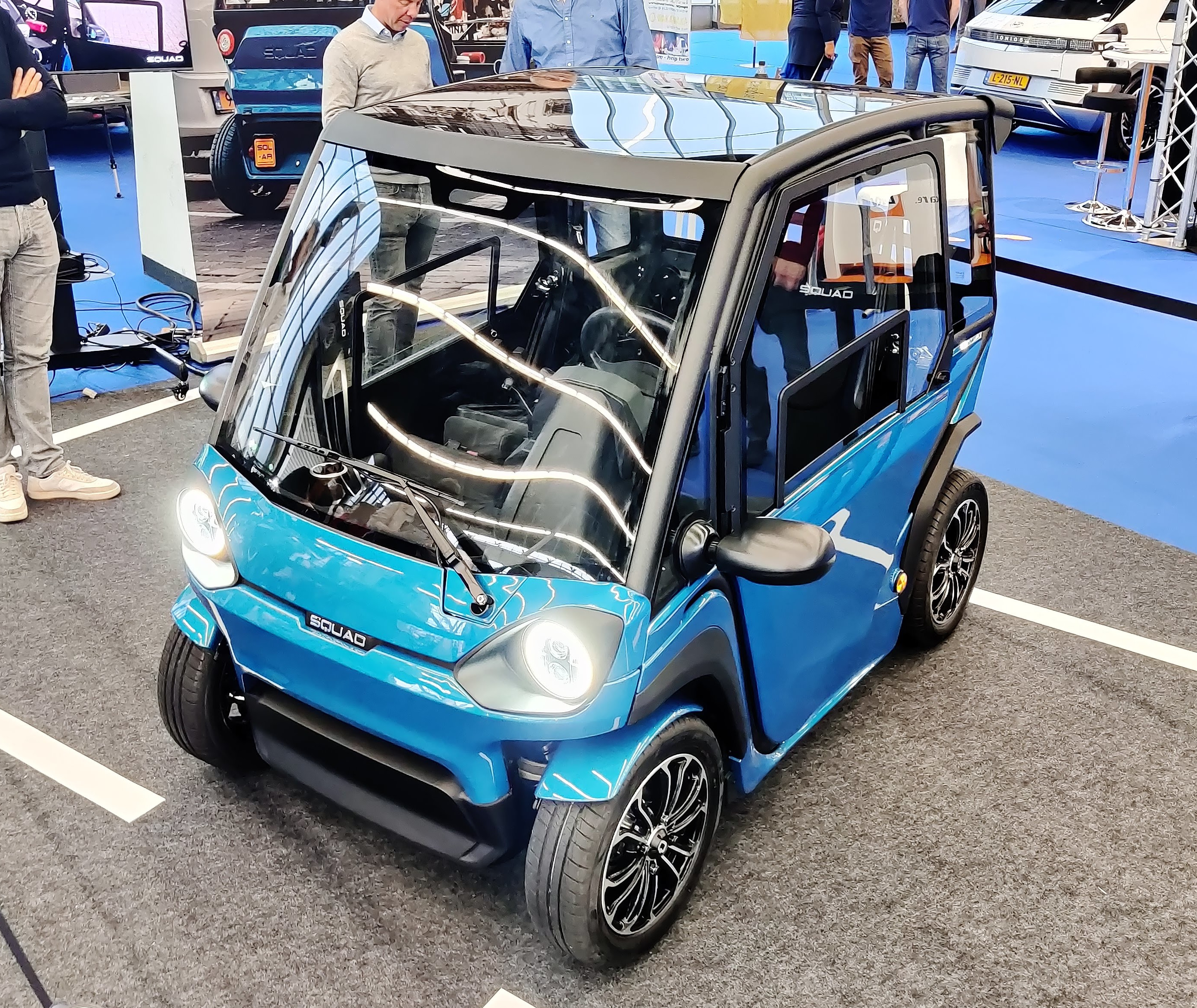

Overview
- Manufacturer: Squad Mobility
- Production: Start 2024 in Europe

Body and chassis
- Class: Neighborhood electric vehicle Microcar; Quadricycle (EU vehicle classification)
- Body style: 2-door
- Doors: Removable

Powertrain
- Electric motor: Two 2 kW rear motors
- Battery: Four 1.6 kWh swappable battery packs for a total of 6.4 kWh lithium-ion battery
- Electric range: 50 km (31 mi) to 100 km (62 mi)

Dimensions
- Length: 2 m (6.6 ft)
- Width: 1.2 m (3.9 ft)
- Height: 1.6 m (5.2 ft)
- Curb weight: 600 lb (272 kg)

The Squad Solar is a compact electric vehicle designed for urban use, classified as a neighborhood electric vehicle (NEV). It features a rooftop solar panel that supplements battery charging, and can also be recharged via a standard electrical outlet. The vehicle is manufactured by Squad Mobility BV based in the Netherlands which was founded by Robert Hoevers and Chris Klok that previously worked at Lightyear. It was originally set to start production (starting with the European market) in 2021, but the date has been repeatedly pushed forward, and production is now set for 2027, with the caveat that "We see that these Start of Production (SoP) and delivery dates unfortunately tend to be very hard to predict".

The solar roof can add up to 21–30 kilometers (13–19 miles) per day of range. The manufacturer is creating an L6 and L7 version in Europe that goes 45 km/h (28 mph) and 70 km/h (43 mph). The efficiency is up to 19 kilometers (12 miles) per kWh, making it more than 3 times as efficient as the Tesla cars available in 2023. The price starts at €6,250 Euros and charges extra for removable doors, air conditioning, heating and added batteries. In the L6 version, only a moped licence is needed to operate and is popular among teens because the age to drive a regular car in Europe is 18 years old.

We are seeing a tremendous interest from the USA, specifically for markets such as sharing platforms, gated communities, campuses, (seaside) resorts, tourism, company terrains, hotels & resorts, amusement parks, and inner-city services.

— Squad co-founder Robert Hoevers

== Gallery ==
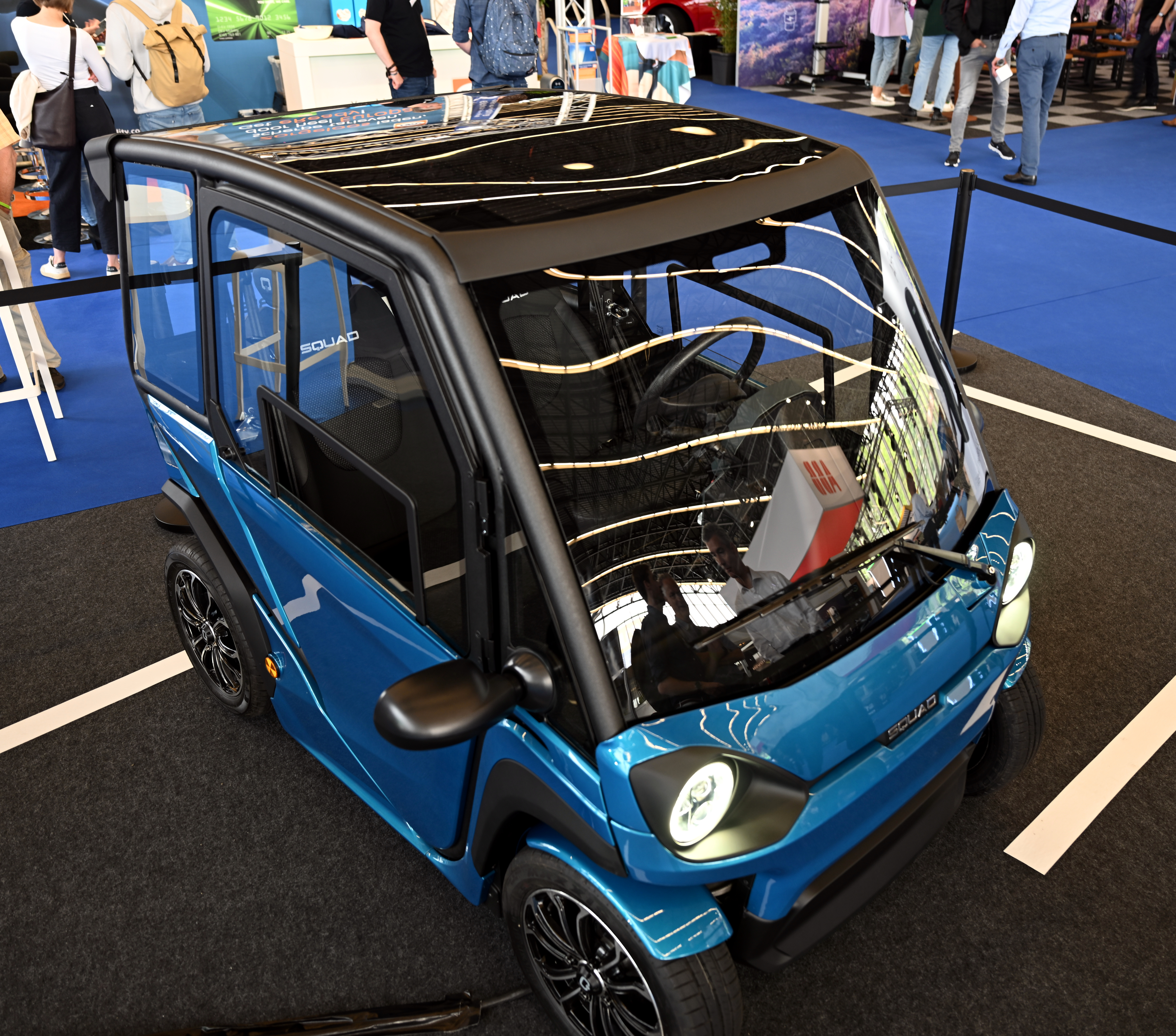
Front side view

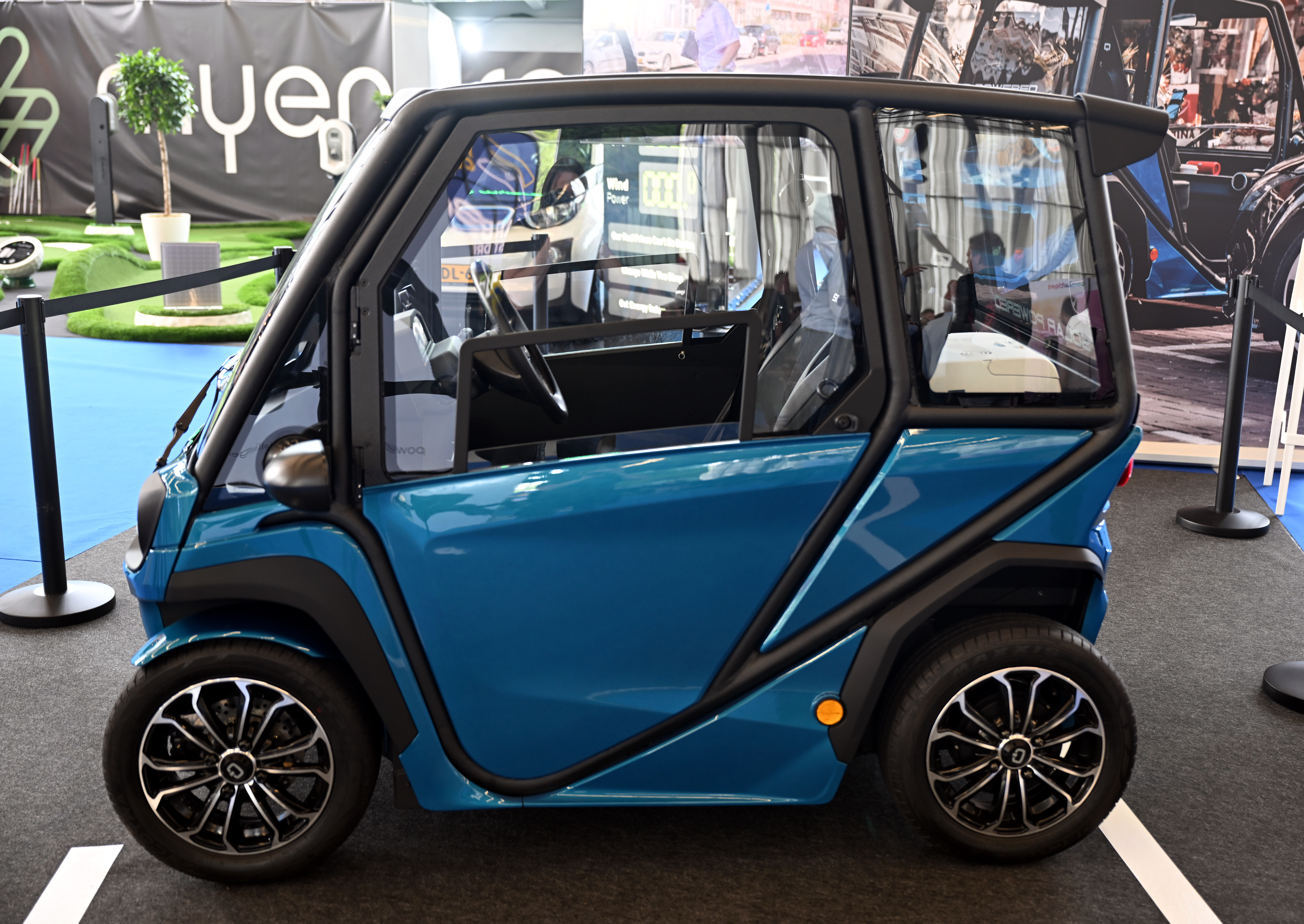
Side view, removable doors

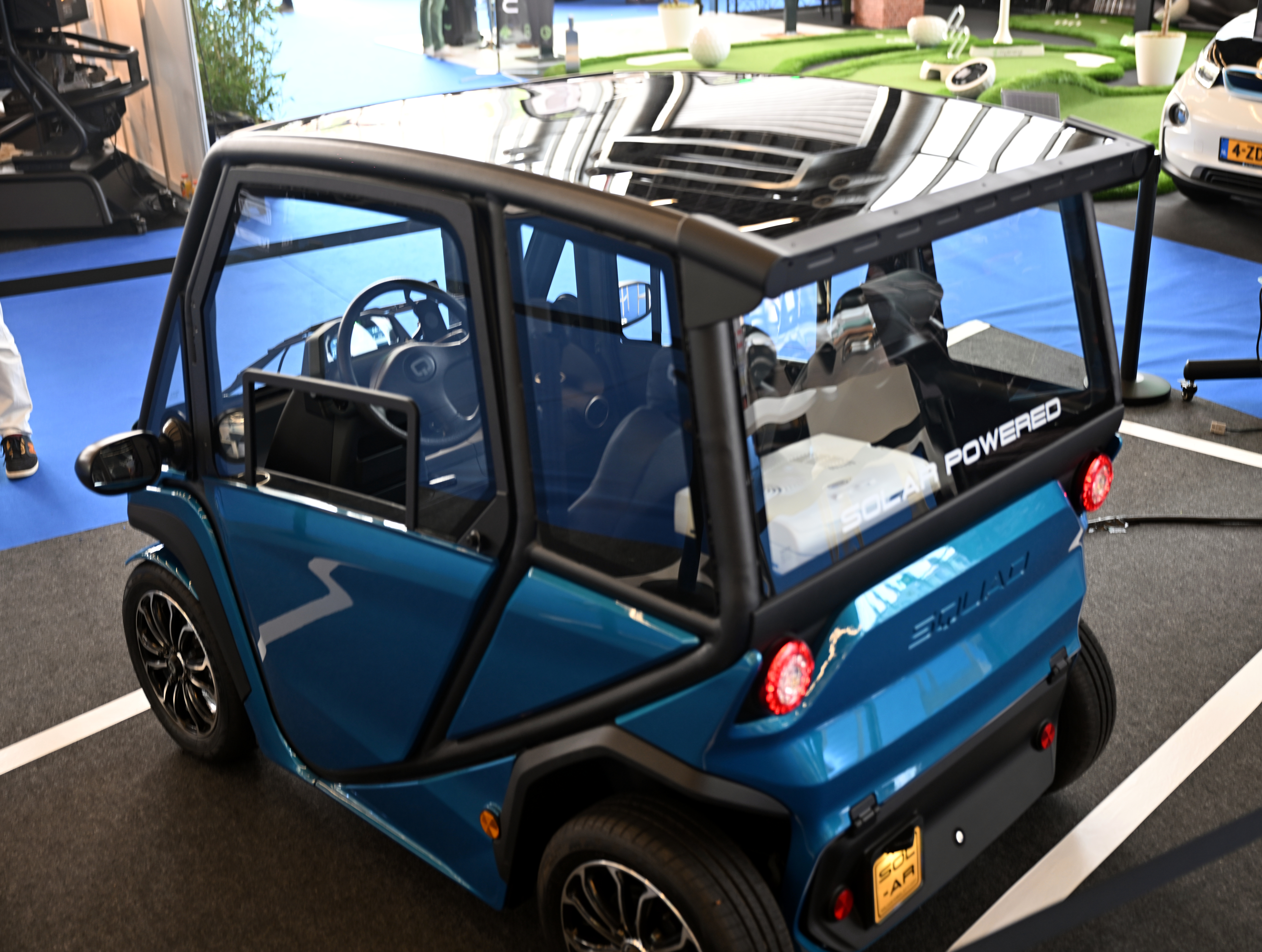
Back left view, with closer view of the solar panel

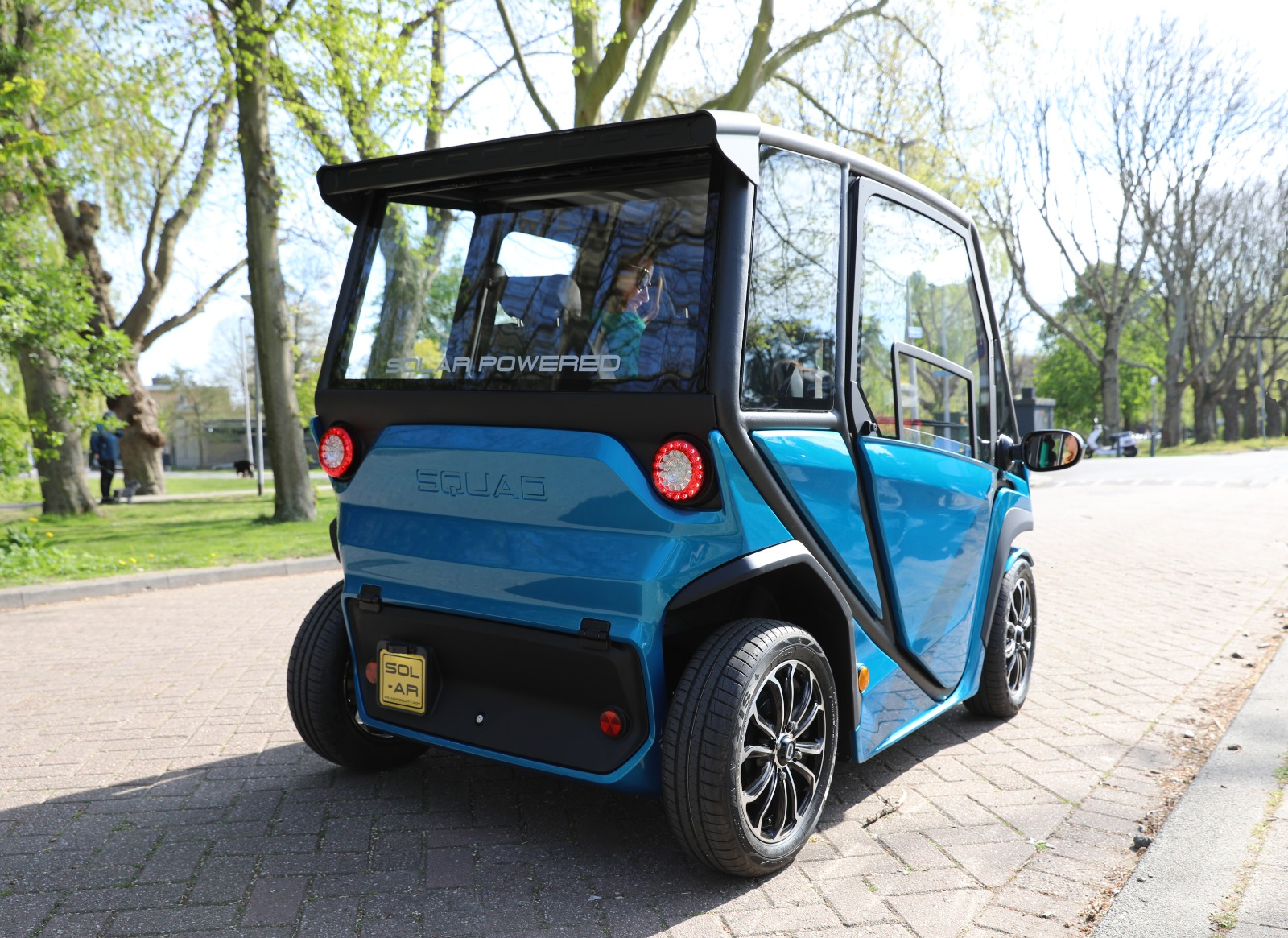
Rear view, no hatchback, storage behind seats, passenger seat folds down for additional storage

== See also ==
- Side-by-side (vehicle)
- Electric rickshaw
- Electric trike
- Kei car
- List of prototype solar-powered cars
- Low-speed vehicle
- Microvan
- Retirement community
