= University of Applied Sciences and Arts Northwestern Switzerland =

Swiss university

- Fachhochschule Nordwestschweiz
- Established: January 1, 2006; 19 years ago
- President: Crispino Bergamaschi
- Academic staff: 539 (2024)
- Total staff: 3278 (2024)
- Students: 13,984 (2024)
- Location: Basel, Brugg-Windisch, Muttenz and Olten, Switzerland; 47.4819°N 8.2114°E
- Website: www.fhnw.ch

The University of Applied Sciences and Arts Northwestern Switzerland (German: Fachhochschule Nordwestschweiz, FHNW) is a university of applied sciences in Switzerland. It is one of the largest universities in the country in terms of student enrollment. It is an inter-cantonal public law institution with its own legal personality. The cantons are Aargau, Basel-Landschaft, Basel-Stadt, and Solothurn.

As part of the state treaty, the supporting cantons manage the FHNW with a fourfold performance mandate. This includes training and further education, application-oriented research and development as well as services for the benefit of third parties.

== History ==
The FHNW was founded on January 1, 2006, based on a state treaty between the cantons of Aargau, Basel-Landschaft, Basel-Stadt, and Solothurn. It was created from the merger of the Aargau University of Applied Sciences (FHA), the Basel University of Applied Sciences (FHBB), the Solothurn University of Applied Sciences (FHSO), and the Basel University of Education and Social Work and the Solothurn University of Education. Since 1 January 2008, the Basel Academy of Music and the Schola Cantorum Basiliensis are part of the FHNW.

== Courses and students ==
The courses are characterized by their practical relevance and are offered as full and/or part-time studies. The FHNW offers 34 bachelor's and 20 master's courses in the fields of applied psychology, architecture, construction and geomatics, computer science, design and art, life sciences, music, teacher training, social work, technology and environment, and business.

In further education, Master of Advanced Studies (MAS), Executive Master of Business Administration (EMBA), Diploma of Advanced Studies (DAS), Certificate of Advanced Studies (CAS) as well as specialist seminars and conferences are offered.

Development of student numbers (students enrolled as of October 15, excluding continuing education).

Year	Diploma/ Bachelor	Master	Total	male/female (in %)
2024	11,187	2797	13,984	46/54
2023	11,006	2606	13,612	48/52
2022	10,780	2549	13,329	48/52
2021	10,889	2515	13,404	48/52
2020	10,800	2361	13,161	49/51
2019	10,500	2146	12,646	49/51
2018	10,308	2111	12,419	50/50
2017	10,218	2012	12,230	50/50
2016	9,943	1945	11,888	49/51
2015	9,436	1826	11,262	49/51
2014	8,871	1663	10,534	48/52
2013	8,424	1579	10,003	49/51
2012	7,893	1543	9,436	49/51
2011	7,405	1489	8,894	50/50
2010	7,344	1316	8,660	50/50
2009	7,115	1057	8,172	50/50
2008	6,891	544	7,435	50/50
2007	6,401	119	6,520	51/49
2006	6,101	61	6,162	52/48

== Organisation ==
The strategic management body of the FHNW is the Fachhochschule Council, which is elected by the governments of the supporting cantons. Operationally, the FHNW is managed by the executive committee (Crispino Bergamaschi) and the Directorate.

The overall supervision of the FHNW is exercised by the parliaments of the four supporting cantons. They set up an Interparliamentary Commission (IPK). The four cantonal governments are responsible for joint supervision of the FHNW, and their business is prepared by the government committee and the four directors of education. Financial supervision is carried out by the financial controls of the supporting cantons.

The FHNW consists of ten Schools (* = main location):

- School of Applied Psychology (Olten*)
- School of Architecture, Civil Engineering and Geomatics (Muttenz*)
- Basel Academy of Art and Design (Basel*)
- School of Computer Science (Windisch)*
- School of Life Sciences (Muttenz*)
- Basel Academy of Music (Basel*)
- School of Education (Muttenz, Solothurn, Windisch*)
- School of Social Work (Muttenz, Olten*)
- School of Engineering and Environment (Brugg-Windisch)
- School of Economics (Basel, Windisch, Olten*)
