= University of Calgary Solar Car Team =

Solar car racing team at the University of Calgary

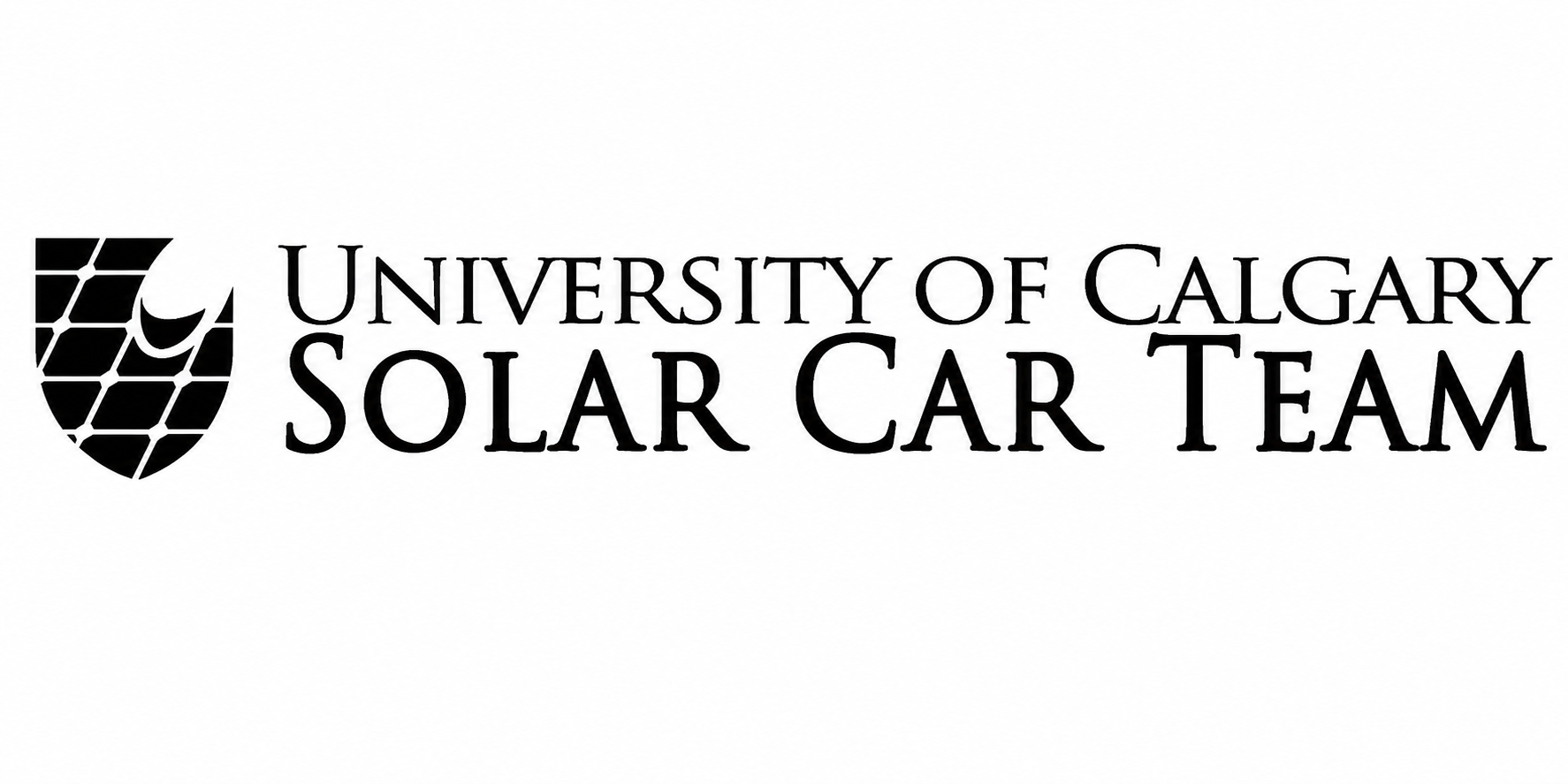
University of Calgary Solar Team Logo

The University of Calgary Solar Car Team is a multidisciplinary, student-run solar car racing ("raycing") team at the University of Calgary, based in Calgary, Alberta, Canada. It was established to design and build a solar car to compete internationally in the Formula Sun Grand Prix (FSGP), American Solar Challenge (ASC) (previously named the North American Solar Challenge) and the World Solar Challenge (WSC). The team is primarily composed of undergraduate students studying Engineering, Science, and Business. The mission of the University of Calgary Solar Car Team is to educate the community about sustainable energy and to serve as an interdisciplinary project through which students and faculty from various departments can collaborate to support sustainable energy.

== History ==
The University of Calgary Solar Car Team was established by the university in the fall of 2004 in response to the North American Solar Challenge 2005, whose finish line was in Calgary, Alberta. The team's first vehicle was completed in nine months and managed to place 13th despite the team's limited experience.

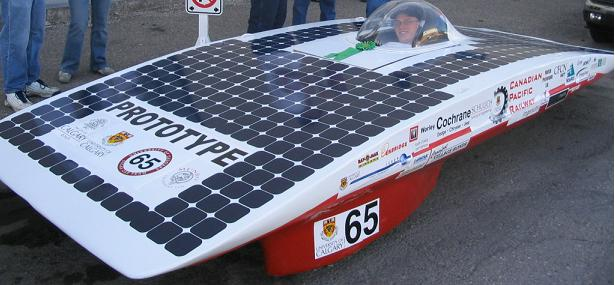
This is an image of the X1, the prototype solar car created by the UC Solar team for testing purposes. In this image it is being piloted by driver James Snell for the Calgary Stampede Parade in the summer of 2005.

== Soleon ==
=== Miracle Workers ===
The team performed a "miracle" by managing to establish a student base with which to construct the car, procure significant sponsorship, and build a working vehicle in approximately nine months despite its limited experience. Established teams have two years to refine existing designs between races.

=== The X1 (prototype) ===
In preparation for its first race, the University of Calgary Solar Car Team constructed and tested a prototype of its designs before building the final car. The X1 was a mockup of and predecessor to Soleon. The X1 was used for driver training and allowed the team to test various design decisions to help ensure a successful final product. The X1 was constructed from a steel chassis with a fiberglass shell which was coated with gelcoat, which made the vehicle approximately twice the final weight of its sister car.

=== First Race Results ===
In its first year of existence, the University of Calgary Solar Car Team successfully competed in the NASC and the WSC. In the 2005 NASC, Soleon, its first-generation rayce car, placed 13th out of 17 cars that made it to the finish line. In the 2005 WSC, Soleon placed 10th overall (out of 18) and first in its class. After hearing about this success, Seymour Schulich was inspired to donate $25 million (with another $25 million matched by the Alberta government) to the University of Calgary engineering department, which was subsequently renamed the Schulich School of Engineering.

== Schulich I ==
=== 2007 WSC Race ===
Following the success of Soleon in the 2005 races, the team had to redesign the vehicle for new WSC regulations and prepare for tougher competition after moving up to the higher, more competitive Challenge class. This class featured higher-efficiency solar cells, upright seating, and teams that had been raycing for 20 years. After shipping its new car to Australia, during testing prior to scrutineering, the vehicle suffered a rear-tire blowout on the track in Darwin, causing it to spin out and lose its tail section upon impacting a guardrail. The team rebuilt the tail section overnight before the race. Despite the stiffer competition and track crash, the team became the first of six Canadian teams to cross the timing finish line, finishing 8th out of 19 in the Challenge class and 15th out of 37 overall.

=== 2008 NASC Race ===
Schulich I was improved after WSC 2007 for racing in the 2008 North American Solar Challenge. The rayce from Dallas, Texas, to Calgary lasted ten days, with the University of Calgary Solar Car Team placing 6th out of 15.

== Schulich Axiom ==
=== 2010 ASC ===
The University of Calgary Solar Car Team's third-generation car, Schulich Axiom, first raced in the 2010 ASC. The race spanned 1,770 km from Tulsa, Oklahoma, to Chicago, Illinois. The team finished in 6th place out of 18 teams and received both the Sportsmanship and Mechanical Engineering awards for the competition. With regulation changes for the 2011 WSC, the team re-engineered the design of Schulich Axiom and completely rebuilt the solar car. Some of the changes made included switching to silicon solar cells and reducing the weight of the vehicle.

=== 2011 WSC ===
The 2011 WSC took place October 16–23, 2011, and was a road endurance race from Darwin, Northern Territory, to Adelaide, South Australia—a total of over 3,000 km. The University of Calgary Solar Car Team entered the Schulich Axiom and placed 18th out of 37 teams, completing a distance of 1,840 km.

== Schulich Delta ==
=== Design and Construction: Focused on Practicality ===
Schulich Delta, the team's fourth-generation vehicle, was designed over the course of eight months and constructed over another three months. Delta was a radical departure for the team, featuring two doors, cupholders, four wheels, a passenger seat, and cargo space for the very first time. It was also Canada's first Cruiser-class car.

=== 2013 WSC ===
The team entered the Schulich Delta to compete in the Cruiser class in the 2013 World Solar Challenge, which took place October 6–13, 2013. The team placed 8th in the Cruiser class.

=== 2015 FSGP ===
After making some improvements to Delta's design, the team competed in the 2015 Formula Sun Grand Prix at the Circuit of the Americas in Austin, Texas, where it was the first Cruiser-class vehicle ever to compete at the event. The event took place between Sunday, July 26, and Friday, July 31, 2015. The team completed 84 laps, placing 9th overall. Its fastest lap was 5:33.886.

== Schulich Elysia ==
=== Design and Construction ===
The University of Calgary's sixth-generation vehicle sought to make significant improvements to its Cruiser-class vehicle while keeping practicality its main focus. The team started the design phase in 2016 and crafted a catamaran-inspired frame to help increase aerodynamics and reduce weight. Furthermore, the team implemented NACA ducts and fans to greatly improve battery cooling performance. Another main focus was the everyday user, achieved by implementing a touchscreen center console infotainment system, cupholders, a backup camera, and speakers. The team also implemented a sophisticated charging system that includes the electric vehicle standard SAE-J1772 connector, which allows the car to perform Level 1 or Level 2 wall charging.

=== 2019 FSGP ===
After a three-year build cycle, the University of Calgary Solar Car Team raced Schulich Elysia at the 2019 Formula Sun Grand Prix, held at the Circuit of the Americas in Austin, Texas. This was the first year that the competition featured a separate MOV (Multi-Occupancy Vehicle) category, and the team finished in 1st place in its class and 4th place overall out of 17 teams, completing 122 laps. Its fastest lap was 5:05.971.

==== Awards ====
At FSGP 2019, the team was presented with four additional awards during the ceremony: the Mechanical Design Award, the MOV Charging System Award, the Aesthetics Award, and the Corner 8 Award.

=== 2022 FSGP ===
Due to issues during the COVID-19 pandemic, the team decided to race Elysia again—with significant upgrades to its electrical and mechanical systems—at the 2022 Formula Sun Grand Prix, held at the Heartland Park Topeka race track in Topeka, Kansas. The team finished in third place in the MOV class, completing 238 laps and recording a fastest lap time of 3:51.

== Achievements ==
Year	Vehicle	Achievements
2005	Soleon	1st Place Stock Class WSC 2005
		10th Place Overall WSC 2005
		13th Place Overall NASC 2005
		Top Canadian team at WSC 2005
		Best Rookie Team, Teamwork and Esprit de Corps Awards at NASC 2005
2007	Schulich I	First of six Canadian teams to cross the timing finish line
		8th Place in Challenge Class WSC 2007
		15th Place Overall WSC 2007
2008		6th Place Overall NASC 2008
2010	Schulich Axiom	6th Place Overall ASC 2010
		Award for Mechanical Engineering Excellence ASC 2010
		Award for Sportsmanship ASC 2010 (shared with two other teams)
2011		18th Place finish WSC 2011
2013	Schulich Delta	8th Place World Solar Challenge Cruiser Class
		Safety Award in WSC 2013
2015		9th Place Overall FSGP 2015
2019	Schulich Elysia	1st Place in the MOV Class FSGP 2019
		4th Place Overall in FSGP 2019
		Mechanical Design Award in FSGP 2019
		MOV Charging System Award in FSGP 2019
		Aesthetics Award in FSGP 2019
		Corner 8 Award in FSGP 2019
2022		3rd Place in the MOV Class FSGP 2022

== Cars ==
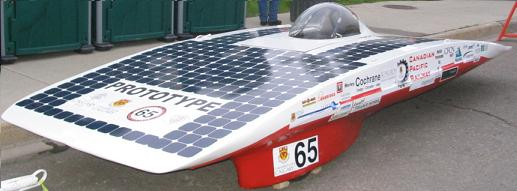

=== X1 (prototype) ===
The X1 prototype was the team's early proof-of-concept vehicle — a steel space frame wrapped in fibreglass and gelcoat. Solar stickers adorned the shell for show; there was no functional solar array. It laid the groundwork for every Schulich vehicle that followed. The chassis is all that remains.

Maximum Achieved Speed: ~70 km/h
Solar Array Type: none (the stickers are merely for show)
Chassis: Steel space frame
Shell Composition: Fibreglass & gelcoat
Commissioned: May 2005
Decommissioned: June 2006

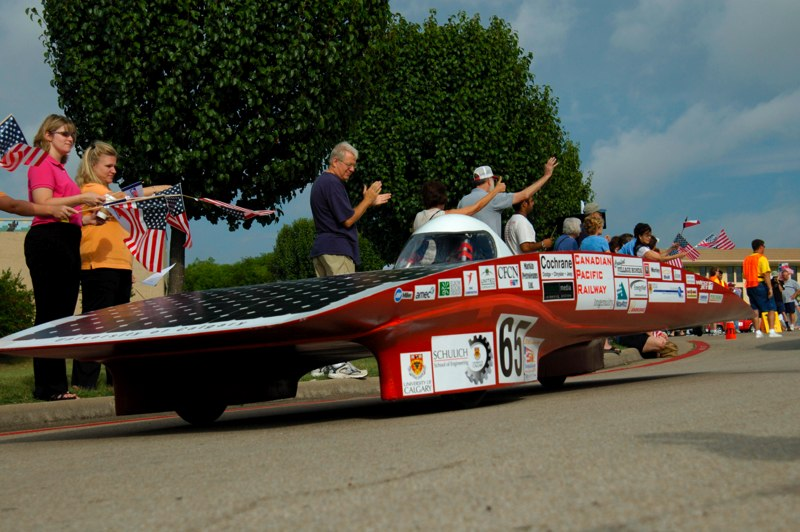

=== Soleon ===
Built in 2004 for the inaugural North American Solar Challenge (2005), Soleon finished 13th — an impressive debut. It then competed in the 2005 World Solar Challenge, placing 1st in its class and 10th overall. In the fall of 2008, Soleon was donated to the Calgary Telus World of Science and was on display for 2 years.

Maximum Achieved Speed: 140 km/h
Solar Array Type: Silicon
Chassis: Aluminum space frame
Shell Composition: Carbon fibre & kevlar
Weight: ~500 lbs
Commissioned: June 2005
Decommissioned: July 2007

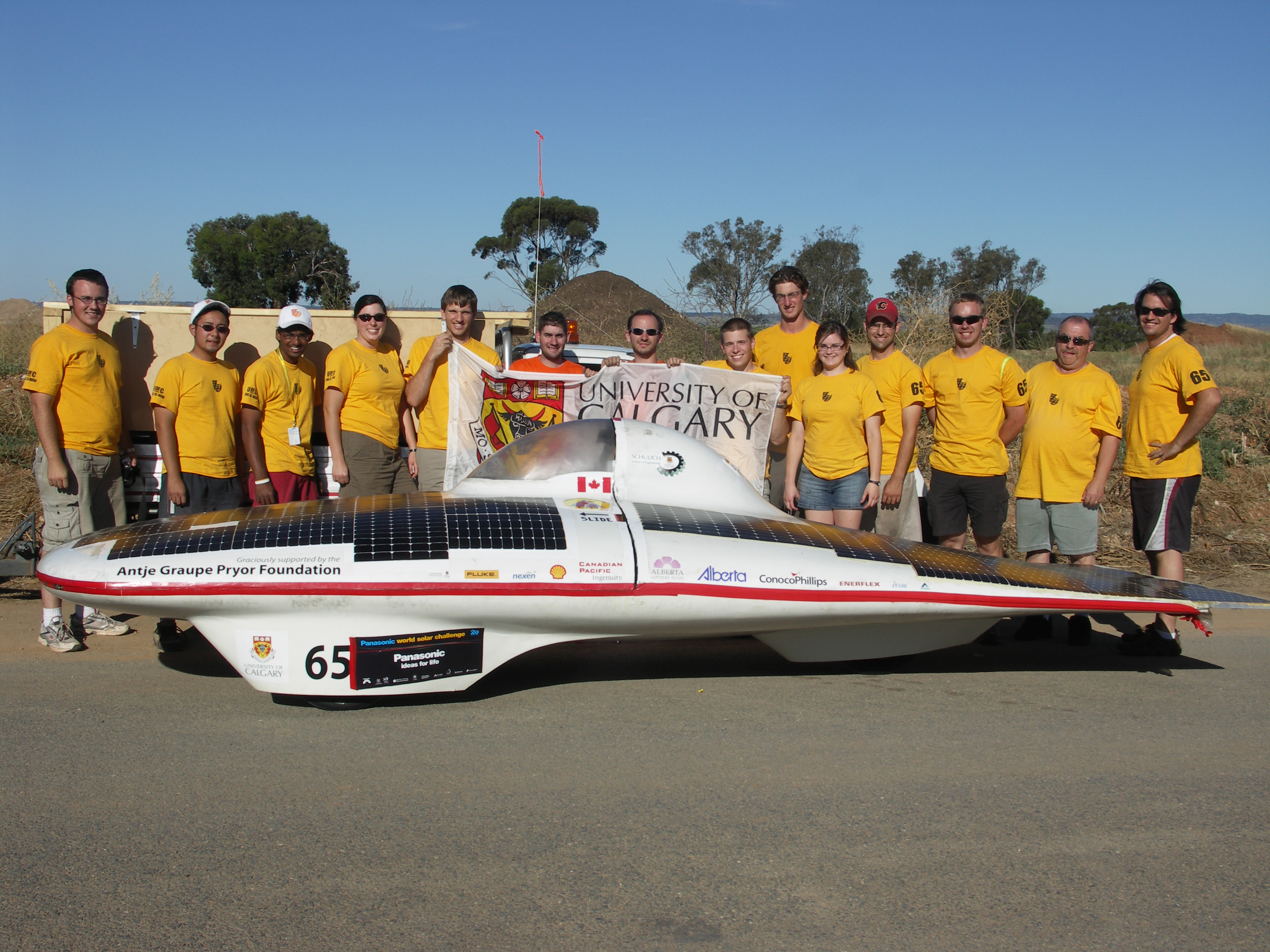

=== Schulich I ===
Schulich I debuted at the 2007 Panasonic World Solar Challenge, finishing 8th as the top Canadian team. It later placed 6th at the 2008 North American Solar Challenge — a team record at the time. As the team's second car, it introduced gallium arsenide solar cells, replacing the silicon cells used on Soleon. Since Axiom was used for driver training, mechanical testing, and PR events, Schulich I has been retired.

Maximum Achieved Speed: 105 km/h
Solar Array Type: Gallium arsenide (GaAs) triple-junction
Chassis: Steel space frame
Shell Composition: Carbon fibre & kevlar
Weight: ~520 lbs
Commissioned: September 2007
Decommissioned: May 2011

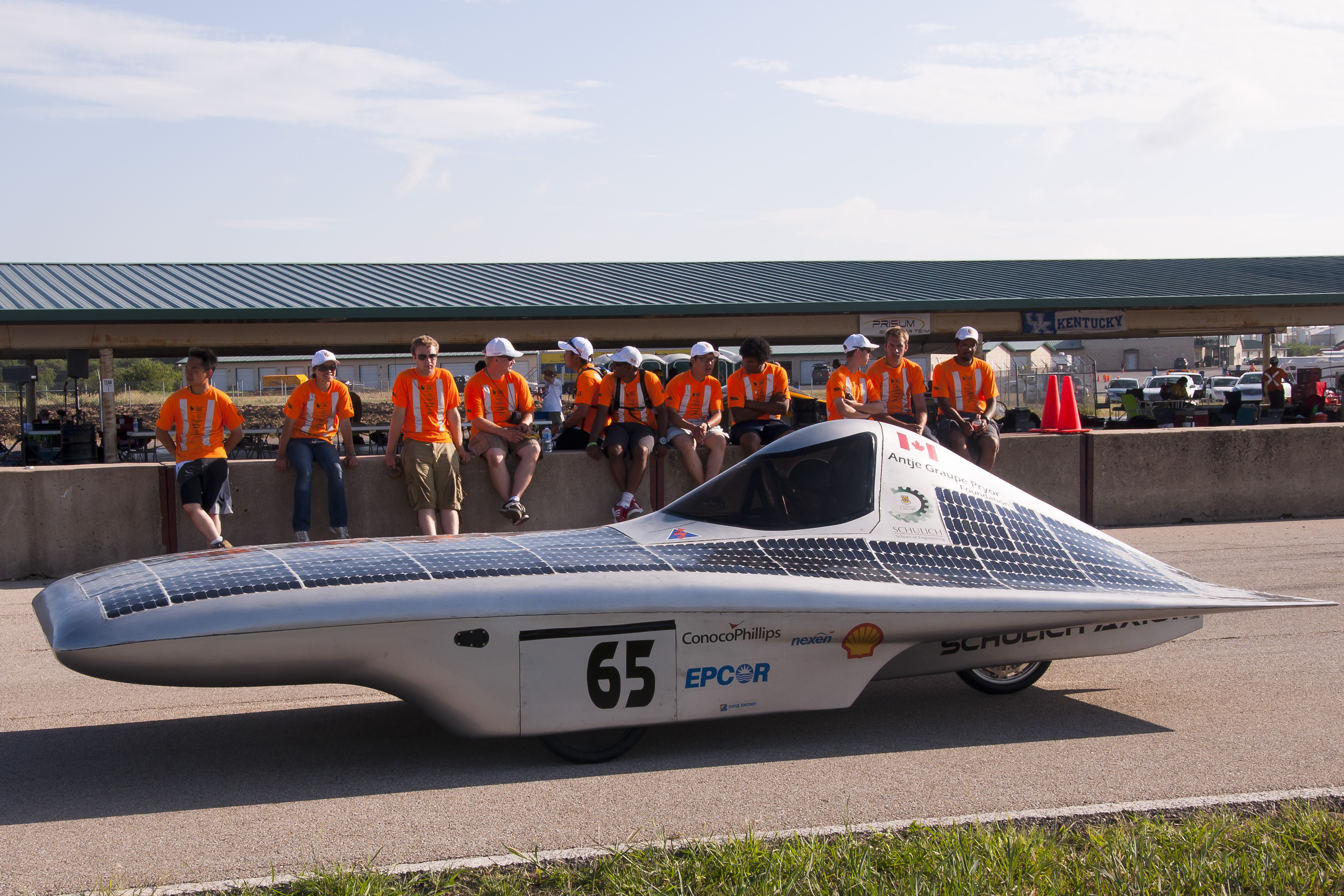

=== Schulich Axiom (2010) ===
Schulich Axiom was the team's challenger-class program from 2010 to 2013. The original configuration placed 6th overall in the 2010 North American Solar Challenge before a major 2011 rebuild for the World Solar Challenge — dropping from ~600 lbs to 390 lbs without driver and ballast, and retired when the program concluded in 2013. All improvements were completed ahead of the 2011 race from Darwin to Adelaide.

Maximum Achieved Speed: 130 km/h
Solar Array Type: Gallium arsenide (GaAs) triple-junction
Chassis: Carbon fibre & kevlar
Shell Composition: Carbon fibre & kevlar
Weight: ~600 lbs
Commissioned: October 2009
Decommissioned: 2011

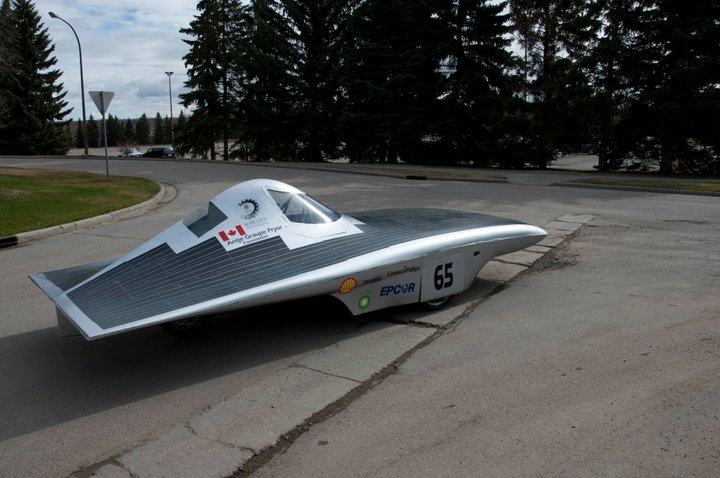

=== Schulich Axiom (2011) ===
"It is evident from the previous race that weight is no minor detail. We have put Axiom on a diet, and the result is stunning. Axiom has dropped from around 600 lbs without driver and ballast to 390 lbs—a loss of 210 lbs!" — Mico Madamesila

Maximum Achieved Speed: 110 km/h
Solar Array Type: Silicon monocrystalline (Si) UC solar embedded
Chassis: Carbon fibre
Shell Composition: Carbon fibre
Weight: ~390 lbs
Commissioned: May 2011
Decommissioned: 2013

=== Schulich Delta ===
Schulich Delta was Canada's first cruiser-class solar car, built from 2012 to 2015. Delta raced in the 2013 Bridgestone World Solar Challenge (8th) and the 2015 Formula Sun Grand Prix, completing 84 laps with a fastest lap of 5:33.886 to finish 9th. Officially retired in 2015, Delta continues to inspire through educational demonstrations.

Commissioned: 2013
Decommissioned: 2015

=== Schulich Elysia ===
Schulich Elysia began its design phase in 2016, and this catamaran-style cruiser was completed in 2019 to improve battery cooling and aerodynamics. Elysia took first place in the Multi-Occupant Vehicle Class at the 2019 American Solar Challenge and completed its final race at the Formula Sun Grand Prix in Bowling Green, Kentucky.

Solar Array Type: Multi-junction GaAs
Shell Composition: Carbon fibre
Commissioned: 2019
Decommissioned: 2025
