= Ralph G. Anderson =

American engineer

- Born: July 19, 1923; Harrodsburg, Kentucky
- Died: February 13, 2010 (aged 86); Cincinnati, Ohio
- Occupation: Entrepreneur
- Years active: 1950–2010
- Known for: Founder of Belcan
- Spouse: Ruth M. Tucker
- Children: Candace McCaw

Ralph G. Anderson (July 19, 1923 – February 13, 2010) was an American engineer, farmer, and the founder of Belcan, one of America's largest engineering firms. He was also a well-known philanthropist.

== Early life and education ==
Anderson was born in Harrodsburg, Kentucky, in 1923. He served as a B-29 flight engineer in the United States Army Air Forces during World War II. He earned a bachelor's degree in mechanical engineering from the University of Kentucky in 1950.

== Professional life ==
After earning his degree, Anderson began work as an engineer for General Electric, General Motors, and the Kett Corporation. He founded Belcan, an engineering services corporation, in October 1958.

== Personal life ==
Ruth and Ralph Anderson had one daughter, Candace McCaw of Cincinnati. They had three grandchildren. When away from Belcan, Anderson spent much of his time curating Anderson Circle Farm, an Angus cattle farm in Mercer County, Kentucky.

== Philanthropy ==
Anderson was an ardent supporter of engineering education. In addition to donating funds for the Ralph G. Anderson Mechanical Engineering Building at the University of Kentucky, he was also a perennial sponsor of the University of Kentucky Solar Car Team, and provided a scholarship for engineering students at the University of Cincinnati. Mr. Anderson also contributed significantly to his home community of Harrodsburg, Ky., including state park development, historic building renovations, community development, and upgrading site knowledge of an important Shaker village including satellite mapping.

== Death ==
On February 13, 2010, Anderson died in Cincinnati, OH at the age of 86.
