= University of Texas Solar Vehicles Team =

Solar car team

Longhorn Racing Solar
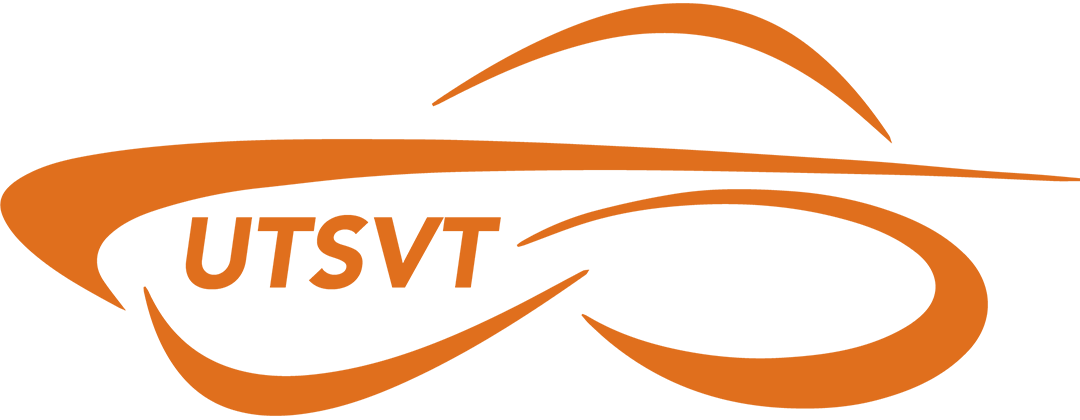
- Abbreviation: UTSVT
- Formation: 1988
- Type: Student Organization
- Headquarters: J. J. Pickle Research Campus; Austin, Texas
- Members: 100 (2025)
- Faculty advisor: Joshua Keena
- Parent organization: Longhorn Racing
- Website: longhornracing.org/solar-vehicle-team
- Formerly called: University of Texas Solar Vehicles Team; Longhorn Solar Race Car Team

The University of Texas Solar Vehicles Team (UTSVT) is a student-driven effort to design, build, test, and race solar vehicles for the purpose of reinforcing skills learned in the classroom, raising awareness of solar power, and bringing solar power closer to practicality. To accomplish this task, a multidisciplinary group of students from various disciplines in the Cockrell School of Engineering, and from other schools across the University of Texas, such as the College of Liberal Arts and the College of Natural Sciences come together to design and construct the most efficient vehicle as possible.

The vehicles are completely powered by the sun and are entered in competitions against universities from across the United States and internationally. The team serves as the host for American Solar Challenge (ASC) and Formula Sun Grand Prix (FSGP). In addition to participating in races, the team participates in outreach events to educate the general public and K-12 students about the excitement of STEM careers and alternative energy.

== Vehicles ==
=== Texas Native Sun I ===
The Longhorn Solar Race Car Team (LSRCT) built its first vehicle, Texas Native Sun, with a graphite and epoxy carbon fiber composite monocoque chassis and body, an 800 watt 1,000-cell solar array, and 66 nickel-hydrogen batteries. A 2 hp (1.5 kW) high-density permanent magnet DC electric motor powered its hydro-mechanical continuously variable transmission via a chain drive. The teardrop-shaped car's length, width, and height were 19 by 6.5 by 5 feet (5.8 m × 2.0 m × 1.5 m), and it weighed 320 pounds (150 kg). Its top speed was 67 mph. Project advisors included professors Gary Vliet and Ron Matthews.

It competed in three races—Sunrayce 1990 (placed 22nd out of 32), Sunrayce 1993, and the California Clean Air Race 1991 where it placed second out of 30 teams.

=== Texas Native Sun II ===
Built in 1995, UT's second solar car, Texas Native Sun II, was a two-seater larger than the first, weighing 1,200 pounds (540 kg) with a top speed of 50 mph (80 km/h). It featured a bespoke electric hub motor and controller supplied by lead-acid batteries. The solar array consisted of 792 terrestrial-grade silicon cells with a peak power of 1.1 kW. An aluminum tubular chassis supported its composite balsa wood and carbon fiber body.

Texas Native Sun II raced in the Tour de Sol in 1996 placing fourth in its class and retired in 1998.

=== Solstice ===
Design started in 1998 for the team's third solar car, Solstice. The 16-member team aimed to follow the principal of "keep it simple, stupid" to make the car to be smaller and lighter than the prior entry. The car was constructed of an aluminum chassis with a carbon fiber honeycomb body. An 8-square-metre (86 ft^{2}) array of 756 monocrystalline silicon solar cells would charge its eight-cell 96-volt battery, sending power to its 6 kW (8 hp) brushless DC motor. Two computers monitor telemetry.

While Solstice was slated for Sunrayce 1999 and the 2001 American Solar Challenge, it was not completed in time. Construction had begun in November 2000. The team planned to run it the Formula Sun Grand Prix in 2002 and 2005 and the American Solar Challenge in 2003.

=== Solar Steer ===
The renamed University of Texas Solar Vehicles Team (UTSVT) began the fourth car in 2004. Solar Steer was the first vehicle to have lithium-ion batteries and a carbon fiber body. After a fatal crash at the 2004 NASC and with the prior car being outdated, the team decided on a clean sheet design prioritizing reliability. It was completed in 2005 at a cost of $60,000. The solar array is made of 600 photovoltaic cells grouped in modules of 50, and split into three subarrays, for a total area of 8 m^{2} (86 ft^{2}). A maximum power output of 1,200 W (1.6 hp) could propel it to a cruising speed of 45 mph (72 km/h) and top speed of 55 mph (89 km/h).

Solar Steer was entered in the 2005 North American Solar Challenge, but after overcoming an initial steering malfunction, it did not pass qualifying in College Station due to the combination of cloudy skies, low battery capacity, and reduced solar efficiency relative to the other teams. The team also entered Solar Steer into the North American Solar Challenge for 2006.

=== Samsung Solorean ===
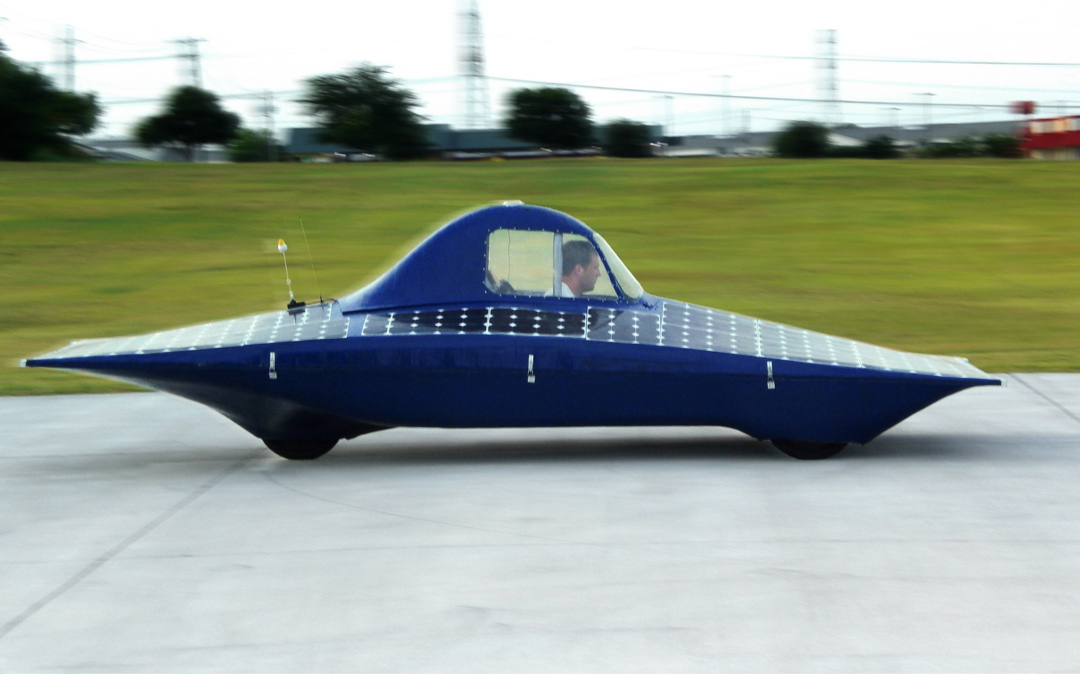
Samsung Solorean

Design began in early 2007 for UTSVT's next car, named after Samsung, their sponsor, and the DeLorean from Back to the Future. Samsung donated roughly half of the $120,000 budget and provided engineering support. The chassis is chromoly tubular steel supporting the carbon fiber body. The battery pack consists of 598 LG 18650 lithium ion cells. The solar array is an assembly of 393 SunPower A-300 monocrystalline silicon cells split into three arrays able to produce up to 1.21 kW (1.62 hp). A National Instruments CompactRIO controls all electrical subsystems. The motor is a New Generation brushless permanent magnet motor that can provide 3.75 kW (5.03 hp) of power at 95% efficiency while weighing 20 kg (44 lb).

UTSVT's 47-member team completed Solorean in June 2008, just too late to compete in the North American Solar Challenge that summer. Samsung Solorean competed in the 2009 and 2010 FSGP and 2010 American Solar Challenge.

=== TexSun ===
TexSun was completed spring 2013 at a cost of $140,000, $50,000 of which was donated by Circuit of the Americas. The three-wheeled vehicle has an aluminum space-frame chassis, carbon fiber body, and uses an Enertrac 602 hub motor to power the rear wheel. The batteries are lithium iron phosphate. It weighs between 500 and 600 lb (230–270 kg). The solar panels, mounted to a carbon-kevlar wing, provide a maximum of 1,300 W (1.7 hp). The car has a theoretical top speed of 60 to 70 mph (97–113 km/h).

TexSun placed sixth at the 2013 Formula Sun Grand Prix held at Circuit of the Americas for the first time. In 2014 the Cockrell School hosted the Formula Sun Grand Prix and the American Solar Challenge. TexSun participated in the 2015 and 2016 FSGPs, and competed for the last time at the 2017 FSGP, which the team hosted.

=== BeVolt ===
Production of BeVolt (portmanteau of Bevo and volt) began in the spring semester of 2017 to be race-ready for Formula Sun Grand Prix 2018. UTSVT again targeted summer 2019 for completion. The planned specifications for the car include a 4.8 kWh lithium-ion battery, a 4 m^{2} (43 ft^{2}) solar array producing 985 W (1.321 hp), and two DC hub motors together good for 2 kW (2.7 hp). The team designed for a weight of 160 kg (350 lb) for BeVolt by using a carbon fiber monocoque chassis and kevlar solar wing. This car fell behind schedule and was ultimately cancelled in 2020 following multiple manufacturing difficulties and the COVID-19 pandemic. BeVolt was budgeted at $180,000.

=== Lonestar ===
UTSVT joined with the Formula SAE combustion team, Longhorn Racing, to become Longhorn Racing Solar (LHRS). They began planning a new car during the fall 2020 semester, with the goal to race during 2022. The team designed their latest car, Lonestar, to weigh 600 lb (270 kg) and have a solar array of 260 cells that produces 875 W (1.173 hp). Design work, finished in December 2020, was done predominantly virtually, with students spread far due to the COVID-19 pandemic. This also impacted manufacturing due to limited hours at J. J. Pickle Research Campus and some team members still working remotely.

The team brought Lonestar to the 2022 FSGP at Heartland Park Topeka but could not race after technical inspection revealed an issue with the battery management system. The team will utilize the car as a test bed for the next car's development, which started summer 2022.

=== Daybreak ===
After Lonestar was found to have disqualifying issues, a new vehicle, Daybreak, was started in the summer of 2022. This vehicle was unveiled in April 2024 and had an expected completion of June 2024. It was slated to compete in FSGP 2024 and beyond. The car, which weighs in at 320 kg (710 lb), has a steel space frame chassis, a 905 watt monocrystalline silicon solar array, and a 5.24 Wh lithium-ion battery powering a 5 kW brushless DC motor.

Daybreak competed in the 2025 FSGP at NCM Motorsports Park in Bowling Green, Kentucky, completing 22 miles (35 km) and marking the team's first track time since TexSun in 2017.

=== High Noon ===
For 2026, the 97-member solar team prepared their next car, High Noon. It weighed 263 kg (580 lb) with a 4130 chomoly space frame chassis. A 1218 W monocrystalline silicon solar array and 4.98 kWh lithium-ion battery power its single 2.0 kW brushless DC hub motor.

The team placed 18th out of 47 teams at the 2026 FSGP at Brainerd International Raceway, completing 59 laps and 183 mi (295 km).

== Team leads ==
UTSVT's longtime faculty advisor is Gary A. Hallock, who has provided guidance since 2001. The current team is led by captain Kayla Lee, chief engineer Advait Joshi, mechanical lead Harshit Dalma, and electrical lead Frank Li. The team mascot is a Sharpei named Mantou and a dinosaur named Solarsarus.

== See also ==
- List of solar car teams
