= CDI Corporation =

US consulting company

CDI Engineering Solutions
- Company type: Private
- Industry: Engineering, Technology, Staffing
- Founded: 1950
- Headquarters: Houston, Texas, United States
- Key people: M. Stephen Karlovic, President & CEO
- Revenue: ▼$ 985 million (FY 2015)
- Operating income: ▼$ -28.596 million (FY 2015)
- Net income: ▼$ -37.003 million (FY 2015)
- Total assets: ▼$ 339.097 million (FY 2015)
- Total equity: ▼$ 221.243 million (FY 2015)
- Number of employees: 900 (December, 2015)
- Website: www.cdiengineeringsolutions.com

CDI Corporation was a privately held US company providing engineering, procurement, construction management and staffing services to clients in a range of industries including energy, chemical, semiconductor and battery manufacturing. As of 2024, the company employed more than 650 employees. The company is headquartered in Houston, TX.

== History ==
CDI Corporation was founded in Philadelphia in 1950 as Comprehensive Designers, Inc. The company provided temporary technical services to manufacturing industries, including servicing the growing automotive and defense industries. In 1956, Walter R. Garrison, an aerospace engineer with Boeing, joined the company as its Chief Engineer. In 1961, Garrison and two colleagues bought the company, and Garrison became CEO.

In 1972, the company diversified into the field of job placement by buying Management Recruiters International, a firm that focused on providing permanent management talent for clients.

In 1973, Comprehensive Designers, Inc. changed its name to CDI Corporation. The company became listed on the New York Stock Exchange in 1988.

In 1991, the company began further diversification into temporary staffing services of clerical and unskilled workers by acquiring temporary placement agency Today's Staffing. By the end of 1994, the company reported over $1 billion in revenue in the three core areas of technical services, temporary services and Management Recruiters, with approximately 3,000 customers.

Combining acquisitions of engineering firms Stubbs, Overbeck & Associates, AWARE Engineering and others, CDI formed CDI Engineering Group (now CDI Engineering Solutions) in 1996.

In March 1997, the company elected Mitch Wienick to the position of CEO and President, to replace the retiring Walter Garrison. Garrison remained on the company's board of directors. In 1999, CDI purchased executive headhunting firm Humana International, further expanding its mid-level management search and recruitment services through the addition of Humana's 136 franchised offices in Europe and Asia. In 2001, Mitch Wienick announced his retirement and Roger H. Ballou was elected as CDI's new president and CEO. In 2003, CDI announced the acquisition of AndersElite, a United Kingdom-based provider of building and construction professionals on a permanent and temporary basis. In September 2007, the company announced the sale of Today's Staffing to Spherion for $40M.

In July 2010, the company announced the acquisition of L. Robert Kimball & Associates, Inc. (L.R. Kimball), a 550-person professional services firm that provided architecture, civil and environmental engineering, communication technology and consulting services. The firm was integrated into CDI Engineering Solutions.

In 2011, Paulett Eberhart, a veteran of Electronic Data Systems, was announced as CDI's new president and CEO, replacing the retiring Roger Ballou. In August 2014, the company announced a new CEO, former Investcorp, Sears and Lehman Brothers executive Scott J. Freidheim. In October 2015, CDI acquired Boston, Massachusetts-based EdgeRock Technologies LLC, a private IT staffing company, for $30 Million. In September 2016, CEO Scott Freidheim resigned, and chief financial officer Michael Castleman was promoted to president and CEO. In September 2016, CDI sold its UK-based subsidiary, CDI AndersElite Ltd. ("Anders"), to the Anders management team and employees.

In 2017, CDI Corporation was taken private by AE Industrial Partners, LLC; at the time of the transaction, it traded in the NYSE under the "CDI" ticker. In December 2017, Belcan, Inc. an AE Industrial Partners platform company, acquired CDI's Aerospace and Industrial Equipment business line.

In September 2018, AE Industrial Partners acquired Gryphon Technologies and combined it with CDI Government Services, which consisted of CDI Marine Company and CDI M&T Company. Gryphon Technologies was subsequently acquired by ManTech International. In October 2018 Artech acquired the talent and technology services business unit of CDI.

In May 2021, CDI Engineering Solutions sold its transportation engineering and architecture division known as L.R. Kimball to TranSystems in order to focus on its core chemicals and energy industrial business.

In February 2022, CDI relocated its headquarters to Houston, TX.

On January 1, 2025, CDI Engineering Solutions, LLC, the sole operating division of CDI Corporation, became a wholly owned subsidiary of Tata Consulting Engineers
