= Formula Sun Grand Prix 2011 =

Formula Sun Grand Prix 2011 took place from May 2 to 7 at the iconic Indianapolis Motor Speedway in Indianapolis, Indiana, as part of the centennial celebrations of the Indianapolis 500. The University of Minnesota's team, Centaurus II, emerged as the overall winner.

Rank	Team	Day 1 Laps	Day 2 Laps	Day 3 Laps	Total Laps
1	University of Minnesota	206	192	171	569
2	Illinois State University	175	191	164	530
3	Northwestern University	174	194	146	514
4	Iowa State University	83	164	156	403
5	University of Kentucky	125	67	125	317
6	Western Michigan University	101	15	91	207
6	Michigan State University	0	124	83	207
8	Missouri S&T	0	4	90	94
9	University of Michigan	90	70	48	43
10	University of New Mexico	0	2	0	2
