= Belcan =

American engineering services company

Belcan, LLC
- Type: Private
- Founded: 1958; 68 years ago in Cincinnati, Ohio, U.S.
- Founder: Ralph G. Anderson
- Headquarters: Cincinnati, Ohio, U.S.
- Number of locations: 60 (2024)
- Area served: Worldwide
- Key people: Lance Kwasniewski (CEO)
- Services: Engineering; supply chain; technical recruiting; IT services
- Revenue: US$950+ million
- Owner: AE Industrial Partners (2015–2024)
- Number of employees: 10,000 (2024)
- Parent: Cognizant (2024–)
- Website: belcan.com

Belcan, LLC is a global supplier of engineering, supply chain, technical recruiting and information technology (IT) services to customers in the aerospace, defense, automotive, industrial and government sectors. Headquartered in Cincinnati, Ohio, Belcan has over 10,000 employees in 50 locations around the world.

== History ==
Belcan Corporation was founded in 1958 by Ralph G. Anderson, an engineering graduate of the University of Kentucky. Until 1976, Belcan concentrated on providing temporary engineering services to companies such as Allison Engine Company, General Electric, Pratt & Whitney and Procter & Gamble.

In 1976 Belcan began to offer outsourced engineering services, hiring permanent engineering staff and performing engineering projects for clients in Belcan's offices. Separate divisions were formed: Engineering for outsourced engineering, and TechServices for temporary engineering services. Procter & Gamble was one of the first major customers of Belcan's in-house services. Beginning in 1976, Belcan began opening TechServices offices throughout the U.S.

In 1983, Belcan was offered a contract by Procter & Gamble to upgrade the production lines for a redesign of their Pampers disposable diapers. Belcan was responsible for the design, procurement, installation, commissioning and training of operations and maintenance personnel for production lines in 4 U.S. plants and seven overseas plants. Belcan expanded their offices and increased staff up to 400 people in order to meet the schedule. The first production line was running 7 months after the start of the project.

In 1987, Belcan formed the Specialty Equipment Engineering Division to service light bulb manufacturing for all of General Electric's worldwide manufacturing plants. SEED subsequently expanded to provide design and build of specialized manufacturing equipment for numerous clients and industries.

In 1991, Belcan and General Electric Aviation formed an alliance for Belcan to provide engineering, design and test support for GE's turbine engines. This relationship continued to grow, and in 2006 GE awarded Belcan a "Super Center" contract to provide support to GE's Aviation, Energy, Oil & Gas, Transportation and Water divisions.

The Staffing Solutions division of Belcan was founded in 1989 to address current customers' light industrial and clerical staffing needs. It had grown to over 25 offices in over 12 states before the division was spun off as Belflex and is no longer a part of Belcan.

Belcan's Engineering and TechServices divisions expanded through the late 1990s to the present with new offices and acquisitions. By 2009 Belcan had approximately 60 offices internationally. On July 13, 2015, AE Industrial Partners LLC announced that it had completed the acquisition of Belcan Corporation. Belcan said that it expanded with offerings in five industry segments: Engineering & Design, Manufacturing & Supply Chain, Systems & Software, Technical Recruiting and Government Services.

On 10 June 2024, Cognizant announced that it was to acquire Belcan for around US$1.3 billion in cash and stock with the intention of expanding Cognizant's presence in the aerospace, defense, space, and automotive sectors. Belcan continued operating under its CEO Lance Kwasniewski as a unit of Cognizant. Cognizant, valued at $33 billion, sought to enhance its specialized service offerings amid a projected slowdown in client spending and an adjusted annual revenue forecast of $18.9 billion to $19.7 billion. The acquisition was completed that August.

== Services ==
Belcan provides services in the following areas:

=== Engineering services ===
Belcan's Engineering Services division has 3,500 engineers in 25 offices providing full-service engineering support to clients in the Aviation, Energy, Heavy Equipment, Transportation, Marine, Medical and Consumer & Industrial Products industries. Capabilities include design engineering, engineering analysis (such as finite element analysis and computational fluid dynamics), design drafting, software, electronics and control systems, systems engineering, manufacturing engineering, customer service engineering and project management.

=== Technical services ===
Belcan's Technical Services division provides contract personnel and direct hire recruiting of technical professionals across multiple industries, as well as IT infrastructure services to government and commercial clients.

== Recent acquisitions ==
- Tandel Systems, Inc., January 2016
- East Kilbride Engineering Services (EKES), February 2016
- Intercom Consulting & Federal Systems, June 2016
- The Kemtah Group Incorporated, January 2017
- CDI Corporation’s Aerospace Assets, December 2017
- Allegiant International, June 2018
- Omega Engineering Services, July 2018
- Sitec Design Ltd. and Sitec Recruitment Ltd., February 2019
- Lagoni Engineering, September 2019
- Base2 Solutions, December 2019
- Telesis Corporation, November 2020
- AVISTA, Inc., November 2020
- VICTOR42, May 2021
- RTM Consulting, September 2022
