= University of Kentucky Solar Car Team =

UK Solar Car Team
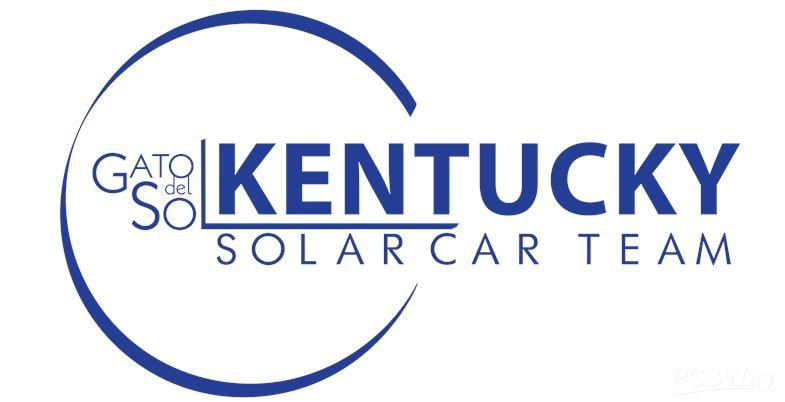
- Founded: 1999
- Base: University of Kentucky
- Current series: ASC/FSGP
- Website: www.uksolarcar.com

The University of Kentucky Solar Car Team is an independent, student-led project that operates as part of the University of Kentucky College of Engineering. The team's primary goal is to compete in the American Solar Challenge (held every two years) and the Formula Sun Grand Prix (held every year) over the summer, but they also perform outreach events in which they display and discuss their car with nonmembers.

== Mission ==
The team's mission is to design, build, and race solar-powered cars while developing team members through practical experience with much-needed hands-on experience outside their demanding course load, all while contributing to STEM outreach in the Bluegrass region. Over the past 20 years, there have been 6 solar cars built, each following naming convention of Gato del Sol followed by a Roman numeral. Gato del Sol VI is the current solar car in use, first formed in 2017.

== Membership ==
Membership is open to all University of Kentucky students (Undergraduate and Graduate), professors, and members of the community.

== Vision ==
The Solar Car Team strives to:

- Continuously improve the safety, reliability, efficiency, and practicality of its vehicle.
- Develop the skills of teamwork, innovation, resourcefulness, communication, and leadership in its team members.
- Spread alternative energy awareness throughout the Commonwealth of Kentucky.

== Accomplishments ==
In 2008, the Solar Car Team completed its first North American Solar Challenge, finishing 11th of 15 teams in the 2400 mile race from Plano, TX, USA to Calgary, AB, Canada. In 2009, the team placed 2nd (out of 11 teams) in the Formula Sun Grand Prix at the Texas Motorsport Ranch in Cresson, TX. In 2010, the team placed 9th in the American Solar Challenge, from Broken Arrow, OK to Naperville, IL. The team celebrated their 20th anniversary in 2019 and secured the track record lap time at Circuit of the Americas for solar cars at 3:48.975. In 2021, the team scored its best results to date: first place in FSGP 2021 and second place and most improved in ASC 2021.

== History ==
The team began in 1999 when University of Kentucky sophomore, Bianca McCartt, approached then Assistant Professor Lyndon Scott Stephens to serve as founding advisor. Together, McCartt and Stephens envisioned a student led organization that focused on solar-based renewable energy. The first UK solar car was originally named Firefly and was a heavy, lead acid battery leviathan that competed as a demonstration vehicle in the organizations first event. Shortly thereafter, then student, and now Professor of Mechanical Engineering, Dr. Christine Trinkle proposed the perennial name for the car, Gato Del Sol ("Cat of the Sun"), and the solar car team had a name befitting the University of Kentucky mascot "the Wildcats". With generous support from benefactors including UK Alums Ralph G. Anderson and Billy Harper, and many businesses including Hyro Aluminum, Inc., Toyota, Sunpower, and Stone Farm (owner of 1982 Kentucky Derby Winner Gato Del Sol), 6 generations of solar cars (Gato I-VI) have resulted with success along the way. The team was the winner of the Sportsmanship Award in the 2003 North American Solar Challenge, finished 2nd at the 2009 Formula Sun Grand Prix and finished 3rd at the 2019 Formula Sun Grand Prix. It has participated in more than 10 race events and hundreds of special events including the annual Kentucky State Fair and regional parades. As of 2020, it is estimated that more than 1500 students from majors across the university have participated in the Solar Car team since its founding 21 years ago. More importantly, through its outreach and education efforts the team has exposed renewable solar energy technology to countless thousands.

== Cars ==
FSGP lap times are recorded in the format mm:ss.s, while ASC stage times are recorded as hh:mm:ss.

Name	Years active	Number	Image	Wheels	Cells	Races and Results
Firefly/Gato del Sol I	1999-2003	4		4	BP Solar Cells	ASC 2003: Passed Scrutineering, DNQ for race. Sportsmanship Award for loaning motor to CalSol's Solar Bear; FSGP 2004: Placed 2nd in Stock Class
Gato del Sol II	2003-2007	4		3	480 Sunpower A-300 cells	NASC 2005: Passed Scrutineering, DNQ for race.; No races held in 2006 or 2007
Gato del Sol III	2007-2010	4 (2007) 3 (2008–2010)		3	480 Sunpower A-300 cells (1200W Peak)	NASC 2008: Passed Scrutineering (6th), Qualified for race (5th), Finished race (11th). Total time: 100:33:24; FSGP 2009: Passed Scrutineering (4th), Placed 2nd out of 9.; Laps Completed: 393; Fastest Lap: 02:33
Gato del Sol IV	2010-2014	3		3	2000 Emcore Advanced Triple-Junction Gallium Arsenide cells	FSGP 2010 (Debut): Passed Scrutineering, Placed 13th out of 14.; Total Miles: 142.8; ASC 2010: Passed Scrutineering, Placed 9th out of 14.; Stage 1 Time: 14:28:04; Stage 2 Time: 15:41:36; Stage 3 Time: 11:59:59; Total Time: 42:09:39; Earned Adversity Award; FSGP 2011: Passed Scrutineering, Placed 5th out of 10.; Laps Completed: 317; FSGP 2012: Passed Scrutineering, Placed 14th out of 16.; Laps Completed: 6; ASC 2012: DNQ for race.
Gato del Sol V	2014-2017	3		3	354 Sunpower C60 encapsulated by Grape Solar cells (21.5% efficiency), 66 Emcore Advanced Triple-Junction Gallium Arsenide cells	FSGP 2014 (Debut): Passed Scrutineering, Placed 14th out of 20.; Laps Completed: 6; Fastest Lap: 5:44.238; ASC 2014: DNQ for race; FSGP 2015: Passed Scrutineering, Placed 10th out of 15.; Laps Completed: 82; Fastest Lap: 04:44.735; FSGP 2016: Passed Scrutineering, Placed 14th out of 20.; Laps Completed: 40; Fastest Lap: 02:46; Obtained provisional qualification for ASC.; ASC 2016: Finished 12th out of 12.; Stage 1 Time: 36:35:18 (DNF); FSGP 2017: Passed Scrutineering (5th), Placed 7th out of 18.; Laps Completed: 80; Fastest Lap: 04:34.297
Gato del Sol VI	2018–present	3		4	260 SunPower E60 bin ME1 24.3% efficiency, encapsulated by SunCat Solar LLC	FSGP 2018 (Debut): Did not complete Scrutineering; FSGP 2019: Placed 3rd out of 12.; Laps Completed: 153; Fastest Lap: 3:48.975 (Track Record at Circuit of the Americas); FSGP 2020: Cancelled due to COVID-19 pandemic; FSGP 2021: Placed 1st out of 8 SOV; Laps completed: 250; Fastest Lap: 3:21; ASC 2021: Placed 2nd out of 7 SOV; One of three SOV teams not to trailer; Earned Most Improved award.

== Press ==
- KETV Omaha
- USA Today, Sunny days ahead for solar car race, July 16, 2008
- Kentucky Living Magazine, Racing with the Sun, December 2008
- The Morehead News, Guardian hosts UK Solar Team, November 11, 2008
- Lexington Herald-Leader, UK Solar Car Builders Celebrate, July 28, 2008
- KMTV Omaha, Drivers Race Cross Country Without Gas, July 16, 2008
- University of Kentucky News, Solar Car Crosses Calgary Finish Line, July 23, 2008
