= Cockrell School of Engineering =

College of The University of Texas at Austin

Coordinates: 30.2885°N 97.7355°W

- Type: Public
- Established: 1894
- Parent institution: University of Texas at Austin
- Endowment: $780 million (November 2, 2023)
- Dean: Roger Bonnecaze
- Faculty: 289
- Undergraduates: 6,112 (Fall 2023)
- Postgraduates: 2.320 (Fall 2023)
- Location: Austin, Texas, USA, Austin, United States Of America
- Website: https://cockrell.utexas.edu/

The Cockrell School of Engineering is the engineering school of the University of Texas at Austin.

The school has more than 8,000 students enrolled in eleven undergraduate and thirteen graduate programs. Annual research expenditures are over $267 million and the school has the fourth-largest number of faculty in the National Academy of Engineering.

Previously known as the College of Engineering, on July 11, 2007, The University of Texas at Austin renamed the College after 1936 graduate Ernest Cockrell Jr., whose family helped to build a $140 million endowment for the College.

== History ==
The College of Engineering at The University of Texas was established as the Department of Engineering in 1894. Thomas Ulvan (T.U.) Taylor became the College's first dean in 1906, and he introduced the "Ramshorn" symbol as a mark of academic excellence within the college. In 1910, Dean Taylor established the Engineers Loan Fund to support aspiring engineers.

Over the years, the College of Engineering expanded with the addition of various departments, including Electrical Engineering (1903–), Civil Engineering (1903–), Mining Engineering (1903–1913), and Architecture (1905–1951). The Division of Engineering Research was established in 1915 to advance engineering knowledge through research initiatives. In subsequent years, the college underwent departmental name changes and expansions, reflecting advancements in engineering disciplines and technologies.

On July 11, 2007, the college was renamed the Cockrell School of Engineering after 1936 graduate Ernest Cockrell Jr.

From T.U. Taylor’s first college engineering course, to the renaming of the College of Engineering after the Cockrell family, to the opening of its Engineering Education and Research Center, Texas Engineering has experienced several milestones while developing its academic programs and facalities.

== Undergraduate departments ==
Rankings, in parentheses, taken from the 2026-2027 edition of U.S. News & World Report.

Overall: 11th

- Petroleum Engineering (1st)
- Chemical Engineering (4th)
- Civil Engineering (4th)
- Environmental Engineering (5th)
- Computer Engineering (8th)
- Aerospace/Aeronautical/Astronautical Engineering (9th)
- Electrical/Electronic/Communications Engineering (9th)
- Mechanical Engineering (10th)
- Bioengineering/Biomedical Engineering (11th)
- Materials Engineering (17th)

== Graduate Departments ==
Rankings, in parentheses, taken from the 2026-2027 edition of U.S. News & World Report.

Overall: 6th

- Petroleum Engineering (1st)
- Civil Engineering (4th)
- Environmental/Environmental Health Engineering (7th)
- Computer Engineering (8th)
- Aerospace/Aeronautical/Astronautical Engineering (8th)
- Chemical Engineering (9th)
- Electrical/Electronic Engineering (12th)
- Mechanical Engineering (16th)
- Nuclear Engineering (17th)
- Materials Engineering (18th)
- Biomedical Engineering (18th)
- Industrial/Manufacturing/Systems Engineering (22nd)

== Traditions ==
=== The Ramshorn ===
The Ramshorn is one of the most prominent symbols associated with the College of Engineering. Its origins as such can be traced back to over a century ago, when T.U. Taylor, the first engineering faculty member and first dean of the College, began drawing the elaborate checkmark on students' work. A mark reserved for perfect papers, Taylor overheard a student remark he had received a "ramshorn" in 1905, from which the symbol took on its current interpretation and significance.

=== Alexander Frederick Claire ===
Alec's beginnings as the patron saint of the College came as the byproduct of the efforts of a group of sophomore engineers back in 1908.

Joe H. Gill and his engineering friends thoughtfully considered how to make a holiday of April Fool's Day. After an unsuccessful attempt involving tying cans around dogs' tails and releasing them to disrupt class, the group of students saw a wooden statue about five feet high while getting refreshments, which they requested to borrow. The next day, Gill presented the statue as their patron saint and traced his ancestry back to ancient times between classes. The presentation successfully broke up classes, and led to his christening as Alexander Frederick Claire, patron saint of UT engineers, exactly one year later. Alec was at the center of a friendly rivalry between law and engineering students for many years, and was subject to numerous escapades such as kidnappings and amputations. Today, what is left of the original wooden statue is safely preserved in the engineering library.

Every year, engineering groups on campus build new Alecs which are then voted on by the students. The winner is announced on April 1 during Alec's birthday party.

== Notable faculty ==
- Willis Adcock, worked on the first atomic bomb and assisted with the invention of the silicon transistor, as well as the integrated circuit
- Alan Bovik, Primetime Emmy Award-winning engineer whose video quality tools pervade television, social media, and home cinema
- Edith Clarke, first woman faculty member of electrical engineering in the US and inventor of Clarke Calculator and method of symmetrical components
- John B. Goodenough, recipient of 2019 Nobel Prize in Chemistry for research leading to creation of lithium-ion battery
- Moriba Jah, space environmentalist and recipient of 'Genius Grant' by the MacArthur Foundation
- Hans Mark, former Secretary of the Air Force and Deputy Administrator of NASA
- Robert Metcalfe, co-inventor of Ethernet
- Yale Patt, inventor of the WOS module, the first complex logic gate implemented on a single piece of silicon
- Ilya Prigogine, recipient of 1977 Nobel Prize in Chemistry for his contributions to non-equilibrium thermodynamics

== Research Centers ==
The Cockrell School of Engineering has formal organized research units that coordinate and promote faculty and student research. These units provide and maintain specialized research facilities for faculty within a designated field.

- Center for Additive Manufacturing and Design Innovation (CAMDI)
- Center for Aeromechanics Research
- Center for Dynamics and Control of Materials
- Center for Electromechanics
- Center for Energy & Environmental Resources
- Center for Energy and Environmental Systems Analysis
- Center for Generative AI
- Center for Space Research
- Center for Subsurface Energy and the Environment
- Center for Transportation Research
- Center for Water and the Environment
- Construction Industry Institute
- Microelectronics Research Center
- Nuclear Engineering Teaching Laboratory
- Texas Institute or Electronics
- Texas Materials Institute
- Texas Quantum Institute
- Wireless Networking & Communications Group

== Student Organizations ==
The Cockrell School of Engineering is home to over 80 student organizations under the supervision of the Engineering Student Success Center. These organizations offer a wide variety of student groups that provide academic, professional development, service and social opportunities. The majority are student chapters of national and international professional engineering organizations. Among the organizations are:

- The Student Engineering Council (SEC) is the umbrella organization of all the engineering student organizations, with over thirty engineering organizations affiliated. The SEC is responsible for acting as the official voice of all engineering students in the school and putting on events that benefit the engineering students, including the Fall Engineering EXPO, which is the 2nd largest student-run career fair in the United States.
- Tau Beta Pi (TBP), the oldest engineering honor society and second oldest collegiate honor society in the nation, is an interdisciplinary organization that recognizes academic excellence across engineering disciplines. The Texas Alpha chapter of TBP invites eligible students from all majors within the Cockrell School to become candidates for election into this prestigious society.
- Omega Chi Epsilon (OXE) is the Chemical Engineering honor society. Candidates are invited each semester to undergo a pledge process that involves service events, social events, and faculty firesides. OXE's meetings feature high-profile industry partners and are open to all engineering students.
- The American Institute of Aeronautics and Astronautics (AIAA) is the primary professional student organization within the Aerospace Engineering Department at the university.
- The American Institute of Chemical Engineers (AICHE) is the primary professional student organization within the Chemical Engineering Department at the university.
- The American Society of Civil Engineers (ASCE) is the primary professional student organization within the Civil Engineering Department at the university.
- The Institute of Transportation Engineers (ITE), the Intelligent Transportation Society of America (ITS America), and the Women's Transportation Seminar (WTS) are the primary professional student organizations for transportation students at the university.
- The American Society of Mechanical Engineers (ASME) is the primary professional student organization within the Mechanical Engineering Department at the university.
- The Institute of Electrical and Electronics Engineers (IEEE) is the primary professional student organization within the Electrical and Computer Engineering Department at the university.
- Eta Kappa Nu (ΗΚΝ) is the honor society of the IEEE and serves electrical engineering, computer engineering, computer science, and other IEEE fields of interest. The university's Psi chapter of ΗΚΝ was chartered in 1928 as the 22nd chapter within ΗΚΝ.
- The Society of Petroleum Engineers (SPE) is the primary professional student organization within the Hildebrand Department of Petroleum and Geosystems Engineering at the university.
- The Society of Hispanic Professional Engineers (SHPE), the Society of Asian Scientists and Engineers (SASE), and the National Society of Black Engineers (NSBE) are three national professional student organizations who represent and develop minority student engineers at the university.
- The Society of Women Engineers (SWE) is a professional student organization that represents women engineers at the university.
- Engineers for a Sustainable World (ESW) is a professional student organization that aims to improve the sustainability of the university.
- Longhorn Racing (LHR) builds two Formula SAE cars each year, combustion and electric, and the Solar Vehicles Team build a new solar-powered car every two years.
