= MotorSport Ranch =

Motorsport track in the United States

The Ranch, MSR Cresson
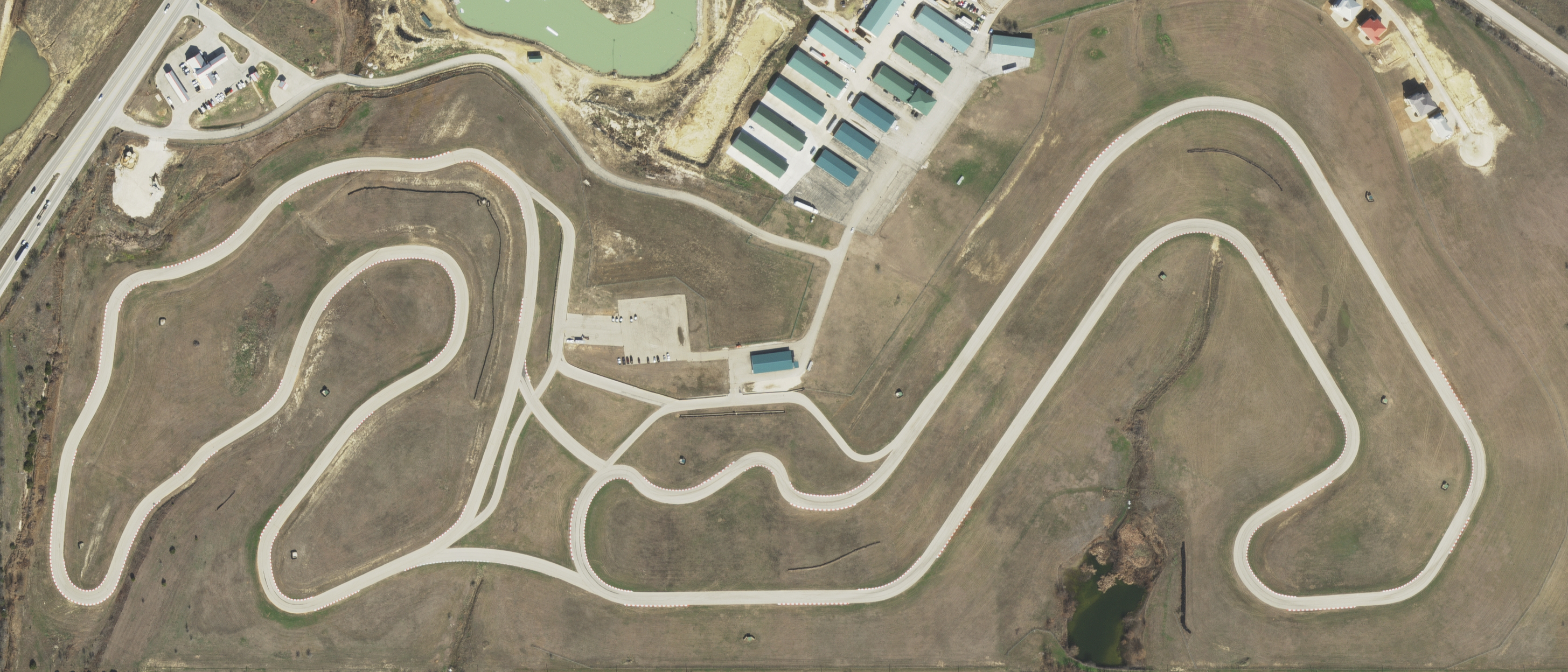
- MotorSport Ranch in 2015
- Location: Cresson, Texas
- Coordinates: 32.523841°N 97.616624°W
- Owner: Jack V. Farr
- Address: 9012 Performance Court; Cresson, TX 76035
- Broke ground: 1996
- Opened: July 1999; 26 years ago
- Architect: Jack V. Farr
- Website: motorsportranch.com

Original 1.7 mile road course (east)
- Surface: asphalt
- Length: 1.7 mi (2.7 km)
- Turns: 11

1.3 mile road course (west)
- Surface: asphalt
- Length: 1.3 mi (2.1 km)
- Turns: 6

3.1 mile combined road course
- Surface: asphalt
- Length: 3.1 mi (5.0 km)
- Turns: 16

Skid pad
- Surface: 200 ft × 200 ft (61 m × 61 m) asphalt

MotorSport Ranch is an auto racing facility located in Cresson, Texas 14 miles (23 km) southwest of Fort Worth. The membership-based track is described as a country club with a road course instead of a golf course, and features three track layouts, a skidpad, garages, a clubhouse, and on-site businesses.

== History ==
Founder and president Jack Farr felt inspired to open a venue for safe and accessible road racing after attending a driving school and realizing the lack of such a place for racing drivers or enthusiasts, including over 20 failed road course projects in the DFW area. Farr envisioned MotorSport Ranch operating as country club but with a road course instead of a golf course, where members pay an initial fee plus monthly fees to maintain membership. In 1996 Farr purchased 304 acres (123 ha) of land in Cresson that was once a working cattle ranch. Over the next four years, $4 million, and five revisions of the layout, the first 1.7 mi (2.7 km) track opened in May 1999 with five members. The next year, the track had 215 members. By the end of 2002 the second 1.3 mi (2.1 km) track opened and the club had 353 members. In 2007 membership grew to 670.

The track has hosted press events, One Lap of America, LATAM Challenge Series, Formula Sun Grand Prix, HPDE events, SCCA Track Night in America, and many other racing series.

A reality TV show of the same name aired 13 episodes between 2005 and 2007.

== Track facilities ==
MotorSport Ranch rests on 304 acres (123 ha) of rolling hills nestled in the south corner of the intersection of US Highway 377 and Texas State Highway 171. The property is split east and west between Johnson and Hood counties, respectively.

The asphalt-polymer track is 40 ft (12 m) wide and configurable to three different layouts, all of which may be driven either clockwise or counterclockwise. The 1.7 mi (2.7 km) layout is the east section of the track and has 11 turns and 30 ft (9.1 m) of elevation changes. The 1.3 mi (2.1 km) layout is the west portion of the track and has 6 turns and 70 ft (21 m) of elevation changes. Those two tracks combine to form the third track 3.1 mi (5.0 km) in length, one of the longest in North America.

The track is open to members 40 weekends per year and also rents to driving schools, tire and car manufacturers, race teams. The facility is home to several on-site motorsports businesses such as Texas Autosports, builder for Formula Mazda. The facility also includes 300 garages, a covered grid pad, skid pad, and a clubhouse with observation deck.
