= Formula Sun Grand Prix =

Annual Solar Car Track race in the United States

Formula Sun Grand Prix
- Venue: Racetracks
- Location: Varies
- Corporate sponsor: Innovators Educational Foundation
- First race: 2000; 26 years ago
- Last race: 2026; 0 years ago
- Distance: Varies
- Laps: Most laps wins
- Duration: 3 days
- Most wins (team): University of Minnesota Solar Vehicle Project

The Formula Sun Grand Prix (FSGP) is an annual solar-car race that takes place on closed-loop race tracks. In the race, teams from colleges and universities throughout North America design, build, test, and race solar-powered vehicles.

Every two years the race serves as a qualifier for the American Solar Challenge road race.

== Format and organization ==
=== Rules ===
- The race consists of three days of freely driving laps around the race track.
- The team with the most total laps driven wins.
- The total area of all solar cells and related reflectors, etc., must not exceed 4 square meters (43 sq ft).
- The solar array may be reoriented toward the sun for charging batteries for specified time periods before and after race hours.
- Strict specifications and engineering scrutiny process is provided for vehicle configuration, safety requirements, and other standards.
- Previous races have divided teams into "open" and "stock" classes based on levels of solar cell and battery technologies.

== History ==
Formula Sun Grand Prix is governed by the Innovators Educational Foundation, and was started in summer 2000 at Heartland Park race track in Topeka, Kansas, in conjunction with a solar-bike race.

It has served as a qualifying race for the biennial American Solar Challenge road race.

The race was held there every year through 2005 until the 2007 American Solar Challenge was canceled due to funding issues. It resumed in 2009 and has been held every year since then at a few different venues.

=== 2000 ===
The inaugural race was held at Heartland Park Topeka race track in Topeka, Kansas. It was won by Rose-Hulman Institute of Technology's Solar Phantom V. The stock class was won by the University of Missouri-Rolla's Solar Miner II.

Results
Rank	Team	Laps
1	Rose-Hulman Institute of Technology	396
2	University of Missouri-Rolla	382
3	University of Minnesota	362
4	Kansas State University	345
5	University of Missouri #4	326
6	Iowa State University	293
7	University of North Dakota	276
8	Lincoln Land Community College	201
9	Purdue University	196
10	Minnesota State / Winona State	166
11	Michigan Tech University	157
12	University of Missouri #43	133
13	South Dakota School of Mines & Technology	124
14	Florida A&M University / Florida State University	122

=== 2001 ===
FSGP 2001 served as a qualifier for the 2001 American Solar Challenge and was the only year when multiple events were held.

- The first event was again held at Heartland Park Topeka and the Rose-Hulman again took first place overall with Solar Phantom VI, while the stock class was won by the co-op team from Minnesota State University, Mankato and Winona State University.

Results
Rank	Team	Laps
1	Rose-Hulman Institute of Technology	353
2	Minnesota State University, Mankato / Winona State	208
3	North Dakota State University	122
4	University of Missouri-Rolla	102
5	Iowa State University	92
6	University of Michigan	92
7	University of Missouri	85
8	Messiah College	80
9	Texas A&M	77
10	University of North Dakota	72
11	University of Waterloo	66
12	University of Minnesota	63
13	Principia College	35

- The second event was held at Gingerman Raceway in South Haven, Michigan, and was won by Principia College's RA IV, while the stock class was won by Stanford University.

Results
Rank	Team
1	Principia College
2	École de technologie supérieure
3	University of Toronto

=== 2002 ===
FSGP 2002 was held at Heartland Park Topeka and was won by the University of Missouri-Rolla's Solar Miner III, while the stock class was won by Kansas State University.

Results
Rank	Team
1	Missouri S&T
2	University of Minnesota
3	Kansas State University
4	Principia College

=== 2003 ===
FSGP 2003 was held at Heartland Park Topeka and served as a qualifier for the 2003 American Solar Challenge. It was won by the University of Minnesota's Borealis II, while Kansas State finished just one lap behind in second place. The stock class was won by North Dakota State University.

Results
Rank	Team
1	University of Minnesota
2	Kansas State University
3	
4	UC Berkeley
5	Auburn University

=== 2004 ===
FSGP 2004 was held at Heartland Park Topeka and the University of Missouri-Rolla's Solar Miner IV took first place overall.

Results
Rank	Team
1	Missouri S&T
2	University of Minnesota
3	Kansas State University
4	University of Missouri

=== 2005 ===
FSGP 2005 was held at Heartland Park Topeka and served as a qualifier for the 2005 North American Solar Challenge. It was won by Minnesota's Borealis III.

Results
Rank	Team
1	University of Minnesota
2	Iowa State University
3	Auburn University
4	UC Berkeley
5	Northwestern University

=== 2009 ===
After a three-year hiatus due to a lack of funding, FSGP 2009 was held at MotorSport Ranch in Cresson, Texas. The University of Minnesota's Centaurus took first place overall.

Results
Rank	Team	Day 1 Laps	Day 2 Laps	Day 3 Laps	Total Laps	Fast Laps
1	University of Minnesota	169	152	166	487	0:02:20
2	University of Kentucky	109	138	146	393	0:02:33
3	Northwestern University	124	102	145	371	0:02:58
4	University of Waterloo	135	104	127	366	0:02:53
5	Illinois State University	77	125	108	310	0:03:20
6	SUNY - New Paltz	63	99	126	288	0:02:53
7	Iowa State University	0	47	157	204	0:02:54
8	University of Texas	34	88	77	199	0:02:31
9	UC Berkeley	0	23	44	67	0:03:00

=== 2010 ===
FSGP 2010 was again held at the MotorSport Ranch Cresson and served as a qualifier for the 2010 American Solar Challenge. It was won by the University of Michigan.

Results
Rank	Team	Day 1 Miles	Day 2 Miles	Day 3 Miles	Total Miles
1	University of Michigan	246.5	251.6	222.7	720.8
2	Bochum	239.7	226.1	214.2	680
3	University of Minnesota	178.5	239.7	198.9	617.1
4	Northwestern University	107.1	175.1	188.7	470.9
5	Kaohsiung	76.5	224.4	210.8	435.2
6	University of Calgary	226.1	163.2	28.9	418.2
7	SUNY - New Paltz	96.9	159.8	159.8	416.5
8	Missouri S&T	147.9	134.3	32.3	314.5
9	Illinois State University	*	149.6	112.2	261.8
10	University of Texas	79.9	134.3	124.1	258.4
11	Iowa State University	127.5	129.2	0	256.7
12	Stanford University	79.9	180.2	28.9	209.1
13	University of Kentucky	23.8	119	0	142.8
14	Western Michigan University	*	*	88.4	88.4

=== 2011 ===
FSGP 2011 was held at the Indianapolis Motor Speedway in Indianapolis, Indiana, as part of the Indianapolis 500's 100th-anniversary celebrations. Minnesota's Centaurus II took first place overall.

Results
Rank	Team	Day 1 Laps	Day 2 Laps	Day 3 Laps	Total Laps
1	University of Minnesota	206	192	171	569
2	Illinois State University	175	191	164	530
3	Northwestern University	174	194	146	514
4	Iowa State University	83	164	156	403
5	University of Kentucky	125	67	125	317
6	Western Michigan University	101	15	91	207
6	Michigan State University	0	124	83	207
8	Missouri S&T	0	4	90	94
9	University of Michigan	90	70	48	43
10	University of New Mexico	0	2	0	2

=== 2012 ===
FSGP 2012 was held at the Monticello Motor Club in Monticello, New York, and served as a qualifier for the 2012 American Solar Challenge. It was won by Michigan.

Results
Rank	Team	Day 1 Laps	Day 2 Laps	Day 3 Laps	Penalty Laps	Total Laps
1	University of Michigan	145	158	146		449
2	Iowa State University	125	146	155		426
3	Western Michigan University	120	119	127		366
4	Illinois State University	88	131	131		350
5	Oregon State University	84	80	19	2	181
6	University of Minnesota	109	0	71		180
7	Principia College	103	58	0	10	151
8	Polytechnique Montreal	76	28	109		137
9	UC Berkeley	0	110	0		110
10	Massachusetts Institute of Technology	0	55	107		107
11	SUNY - New Paltz	0	66	94	2	92
12	Michigan State University	0	0	50		50
13	University of New Mexico	22	0	0		22
14	University of Kentucky	0	0	6		6

=== 2013 ===
FSGP 2013 was held at Circuit of the Americas in Austin, Texas. Oregon State University's Phoenix took first place overall, while Illinois State University's Mercury IV finished one lap behind in second place, and Iowa State University's Hyperion finished one lap behind them in third place.

Results
Rank	Team	Total Laps	Day 1 Laps	Day 2 Laps	Day 3 Laps	Penalty Laps	Fast Lap
1	Oregon State University	193	65	66	63	1	5:26.565
2	Illinois State University	192	64	65	64	1	4:59.886
3	Iowa State University	191	61	52	78		4:42.289
4	Principia College	184	56	54	74		4:46.005
5	Western Michigan University	183	66	64	53		5:36.894
6	University of Texas	121	34	42	60	15	5:02.661
7	University of Waterloo	20	0	0	20		6:33.359
8	Southern Illinois University Edwardsville	10	7	1	2		7:25.008
9	Georgia Tech	1	0	0	3	2	N/A

=== 2014 ===
FSGP 2014 was again held at Circuit of the Americas and served as a qualifier for the 2014 American Solar Challenge. It was won by Michigan. The race was marred by an electrical fire in a garage causing many team's cars and equipment to be damaged by water from the complex's sprinkler system.

Results
Rank	Team	Total Laps	Day 1 Laps	Day 2 Laps	Day 3 Laps	Penalty Laps	Fast Lap
1	University of Michigan	174	69	51	54		5:05.490
2	Oregon State University	124	46	26	52		4:56.344
3	University of Minnesota	110	34	53	24	1	5:17.913
3	Western Michigan University	110	51	14	45		6:09.962
5	Iowa State University	92		46	46		4:35.285
6	Polytechnique Montreal	91	32	17	42		6:07.705
7	Missouri S&T	88		40	48		5:13.075
8	Qazvin Islamic Azad University	83	42	51	32	42	4:52.169
9	École de technologie supérieure	77	25	24	33	5	7:07.314
10	Principia College	66		54	13	1	4:36.109
11	University of Texas	39	32	5	40	38	6:43.137
12	Massachusetts Institute of Technology	13			13		5:17.693
12	Southern Illinois University Edwardsville	13		11	3	1	14:55.801
14	University of Kentucky	5			6	1	5:44.238
14	UC Berkeley	5			5		7:07.323
16	Illinois State University	0	13	14		27	5:31.655
16	University of Puerto Rico at Mayagüez	0			0		

=== 2015 ===
FSGP 2015 was held again at Circuit of the Americas on July 29–31, 2015. It was won by Iowa State University with 223 total laps and a fast lap of 4:30.444, both track records for solar cars. Hot weather forced most of the teams to have to pull into the pits at times to cool their batteries. The University of Calgary became the first Cruiser team to compete in FSGP.

Results
Rank	Team	Total Laps	Day 1 Laps	Day 2 Laps	Day 3 Laps	Penalty Laps	Fast Lap
1	Iowa State University	223	76	70	77		4:30.444
2	Polytechnique Montreal	192	61	63	68		4:53.313
3	Illinois State University	185	69	56	60		5:05.834
4	Missouri S&T	181	61	66	63	9	4:49.051
5	Principia College	136	50	40	46		5:24.838
6	University of Texas	133	47	40	51	5	6:27.730
7	UC Berkeley	110	30	42	40	2	5:08.716
8	McMaster University	93	38	21	38	4	6:37.638
9	University of Kentucky	82	33	29	22	2	4:44.735
9*	University of Calgary (Cruiser)*	84	20	21	43		5:33.886
11	Southern Illinois University Edwardsville	66	28	16	22		5:40.215
12	University of Puerto Rico at Mayagüez	57	17	34	21	15	5:25.893
13	Georgia Tech	27	10	5	13	1	7:19.903
14	University of Western Ontario	0	0	1	0	1	

* Teams with a Cruiser Class vehicle tied below the next conventional team.

=== 2016 ===
FSGP 2016 took place at Pitt Race in Wampum, Pennsylvania on July 26–28, 2016. It served as a qualifier for the 2016 American Solar Challenge. It was won by Michigan.

Results
Rank	Team	Total Laps	Day 1 Laps	Day 2 Laps	Day 3 Laps	Penalty Laps	Fast Lap
1	University of Michigan	518	201	194	126	3	1:41
2	Principia College	454	170	172	112		2:04
3	Appalachian State University	414	153	130	131		2:19
4	University of Minnesota (Cruiser)	386	140	154	94	2	2:03
5	Illinois State University	327	120	117	90		1:54
6	Polytechnique Montreal	321	107	118	96		1:59
7	École de technologie supérieure	308	141	65	104	2	2:04
8	University of Toronto	304	83	165	61	5	2:07
9	Iowa State University	241	35	137	72	3	2:01
10	UC Berkeley	203	0	117	88	2	1:57
11	Missouri S&T	195	0	91	114	10	2:11
12	McMaster University	177	69	72	42	6	2:29
13	Dunwoody College of Technology	108	0	63	109	64	2:16
14	University of Kentucky	40	53	0	44	57	2:46
15	Zurich University of Applied Sciences	22	0	33	24	35	2:14
16	Northwestern University	21	0	6	24	9	2:33

=== 2017 ===
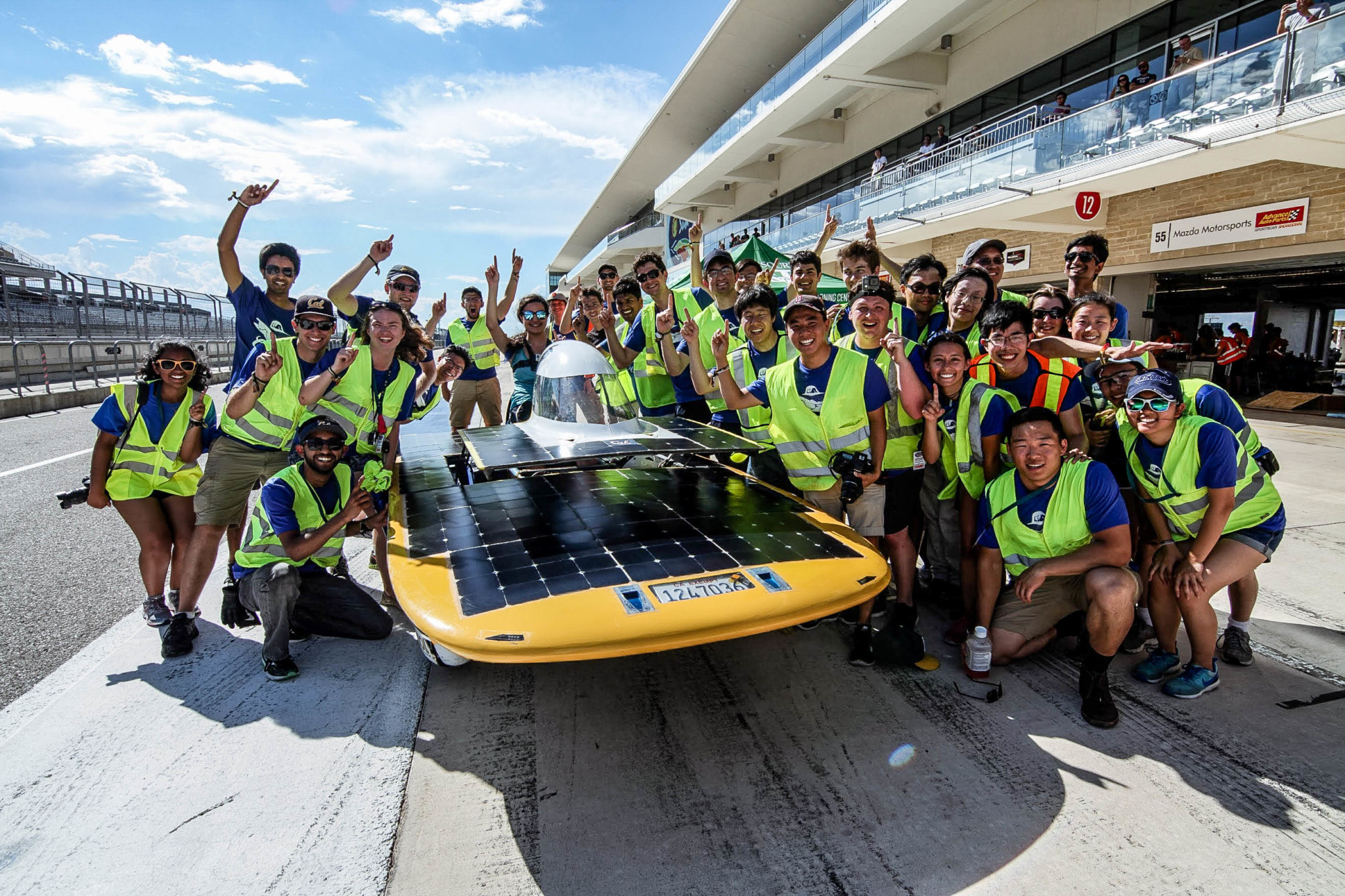
The University of California Berkeley solar car team, CalSol, wins first place at the 2017 Formula Sun Grand Prix at Circuit of the Americas in Austin, Texas during the competition July 6-8, 2017. The team poses with their car, Zephyr.

FSGP 2017 was held again at Circuit of the Americas on July 6–8, 2017. It was won by the CalSol team of UC Berkeley with 228 total laps.

Results
Rank	Team	Day 1 Laps	Day 2 Laps	Day 3 Laps	Penalty Laps	Total Laps	Fast Lap
1	UC Berkeley	72	74	82	0	228	4:35.848
2	Appalachian State University	70	72	76	0	218	5:14.071
3	Polytechnique Montreal	67	69	64	2	198	4:32.542
4	École de technologie supérieure	73	66	39	4	174	5:21.554
5	Illinois State University	46	62	64	0	172	4:56.347
6	Georgia Tech	40	25	39	15	89	8:09.185
7	University of Kentucky	30	28	22	0	80	4:34.297
8	Missouri S&T	14	20	54	19	69	5:14.117
9	University of Texas	9	29	31	9	60	8:16.501
10	Southern Illinois University Edwardsville	19	4	34	0	57	8:18.929
11	University of Puerto Rico at Mayagüez	20	11	23	19	35	6:21.639
12	Northwestern University	4	6	18	16	12	6:38.000
13	Principia College	0	1	28	18	11	4:43.125
14	Western Michigan University	0	0	1	0	1	

=== 2018 ===
FSGP 2018 was held at Motorsports Park Hastings in Hastings, Nebraska on July 10–12, 2018. This year featured the first ever Multi-Occupant Vehicle (MOV) class at FSGP, which was won by University of Minnesota with triple the score of the runner-up, setting a record as the first team to win FSGP 5 times. The Single-Occupant Vehicle (SOV) class was won by Polytechnique Montreal with 403 laps.

=== 2019 ===
FSGP 2019 was held at Circuit of the Americas in Austin, Texas on July 4–6, 2019. The Multi-Occupant Vehicle (MOV) class was won by University of Calgary with a Score of 24.188. The Single-Occupant Vehicle (SOV) class was won by Polytechnique Montreal with 230 laps.

SOV Results
Rank	Team	Day 1 Laps	Day 2 Laps	Day 3 Laps	Penalty Laps	Total Laps	Fast Lap
1	Polytechnique Montreal	81	79	73	3	230	4:17.123
2	Principia College	59	69	67	0	195	4:34.955
3	University of Kentucky	58	26	69	0	153	3:48.975
4	University of Illinois	14	60	40	3	111	4:54.896
5	Western Michigan University	43	26	40	3	106	7:12.832
6	University of Puerto Rico at Mayagüez	25	31	32	15	73	7:17.059
7	Illinois State University		19	51	2	68	4:39.604
8	University of Florida		23	37	8	52	6:46.549
9	Georgia Tech		13	36	4	45	7:01.993
10	Northwestern University			43	2	41	5:38.059

MOV Scoring
Team	Score (S)	Target Spd Derate (T)	Completion (C)	# Ext Energy Use (E) [kWh]	Person-Mile Distance (D) [mi]	Avg Spd (Va) [mph]	Batt Capacity (Q) [kWh]	Mileage Driven [mi]	Penalty Miles [mi]
University of Calgary	24.188194444	1.000000000	100.00%	34.560	835.944	30.257	17.280	417.972	0.000
UC Berkeley	13.170718561	1.000000000	41.80%	15.876	500.196	28.770	15.876	250.098	75.372
University of Waterloo	0.544800069	1.000000000	9.02%	15.876	95.928	28.148	15.876	47.964	10.278

MOV Lap Counts
Team	Day 1 Laps	Day 2 Laps	Day 3 Laps	Penalty Laps	Total Laps	Fast Lap
65 – University of Calgary	33	27	62	0	122	5:05.971
6 – UC Berkeley	0	24	49	22	51	6:02.774
24 – University of Waterloo		0	14	3	11	6:08.452

=== 2020 ===
FSGP 2020 was planned to return to Heartland Park Topeka on July 10-16, 2020, but was postponed to September and ultimately cancelled due to the COVID-19 pandemic.

=== 2021 ===
FSGP 2021 was held at Heartland Park Topeka on July 30-August 1, 2021. The Multi-Occupant Vehicle (MOV) class was won by University of Minnesota with a Score of 26.873. The Single-Occupant Vehicle (SOV) class was won by the University of Kentucky with 250 laps.

SOV Results
Rank	Team	Day 1 Laps	Day 2 Laps	Day 3 Laps	Penalty Laps	Total Laps	Fast Lap
1	University of Kentucky	68	92	90	0	250	03:21
2	MIT	65	83	91	8	239	3:19
3	University of Illinois	82	62	86	11	230	4:08
4	Illinois State	42	86	78	2	206	3:19
5	UC Berkeley	25	74	91	9	190	3:34
6	Georgia Tech	5	66	76	7	147	3:26
7	Principia College	0	0	87	9	87	3:33
8	Western Michigan University	0	0	13	1	13	4:09

MOV Lap Counts
Rank	Team	Day 1 Laps	Day 2 Laps	Day 3 Laps	Penalty Laps	Total Laps	Fast Lap
1	University of Minnesota	85	48	48	3	178	3:43
2	Appalachian State	0	81	50	2	129	3:43
3	Iowa State	0	2	33	6	29	3:44
4	North Carolina State	3	2	0	2	3	5:44

MOV Scoring Details
Team	Score [S]	Speed Derate [T]	Completion [C]	Ext kWh [E]	Person-Miles [D]	Avg MPH [Va]	Battery kWh [Q]	Miles Driven	Penalty Miles
University of Minnesota	26.873720446	1.000000000	98.34%	33.117	905	32.108	19.537	452.5	7.5
Appalachian State	2.550194474	0.208508923	71.27%	38.168	655	28.289	19.084	327.5	5
Iowa State	0.051030000	0.056969393	16.02%	31.298	175	26.873	15.649	87.5	15
North Carolina State	0.000000006	0.000000746	1.66%	55.964	25	14.603	25.392	12.5	5

=== 2022 ===
FSGP 2022 was held at Heartland Park Topeka on July 5-7, 2022. The Multi-Occupant Vehicle (MOV) class was won by Polytechnique Montréal with a Score of 135.4. The Single-Occupant Vehicle (SOV) class was won by Principia College with 299 laps.

SOV Results
Rank	Team	Day 1 Laps	Day 2 Laps	Day 3 Laps	Penalty Laps	Total Laps	Fast Lap
1	Principia College	105	100	98	4	299	03:20
2	MIT	93	106	92	1	290	3:15
3	University of Kentucky	88	89	91	3	270	3:08
4	University of California, Berkeley	92	82	91	3	262	4:07
5	University of Illinois Urbana-Champaign	89	87	88	6	258	3:56
6	Georgia Tech	84	60	50	3	191	4:20
7	École de technologie supérieure	0	83	15	3	95	3:40
8	Western Michigan University	47	10	14	6	79	4:02
9	University of British Columbia	0	33	27	8	52	4:43
10	University of Florida	0	22	53	24	51	3:56
11	Illinois State University	4	0	37	4	37	3:18
12	University of Virginia	0	0	16	0	16	4:53
13	University of Kansas	0	0	1	0	1	11:33

MOV Lap Counts
Rank	Team	Day 1 Laps	Day 2 Laps	Day 3 Laps	Penalty Laps	Total Laps	Fast Lap
1	University of Minnesota	98	102	95	0	295	3:40
2	Polytechnique Montréal	89	87	95	1	270	4:16
3	University of Calgary	81	81	85	9	238	3:51
4	Iowa State	38	90	84	7	209	3:32
5	Appalachian State	29	80	82	0	190	3:46
6	North Carolina State	11	27	37	0	75	3:01

MOV Scoring Details
Team	Score [S]	Speed Derate [T]	Completion [C]	Ext kWh [E]	Person-Miles [D]	Avg MPH	Battery kWh	Miles Driven	Penalty Miles
Polytechnique Montréal	135.4	1.0	91.53%	9.16	1355	30.8	9.16	677.5	2.5
University of Minnesota	35.0	1.0	100.00%	42.16	1475	33.4	20.12	737.5	0
University of Calgary	22.7	1.0	80.68%	43.945	1235	31.1	17.885	617.5	22.5
Iowa State University	19.1	1.0	70.85%	39.399	1060	32.6	15.649	530.0	7.5
Appalachian State University	13.7	1.0	64.41%	44.81	950	32.7	22.14	475.0	0
North Carolina State University	1.3	1.0	25.42%	71.566	375	34.4	20.442	187.5	0

=== 2023 ===
Electrek FSGP 2023 was held at Heartland Motorsports Park. Topeka, KS June 27 - July 2. The Single-Occupant Vehicle (SOV) class was won by the University of Florida - 707.5 miles (283 laps). The Multi-Occupant Vehicle (MOV) class was won by Polytechnique Montréal with a 137.3 points / 1,315 person miles (263 laps).

=== 2024 ===
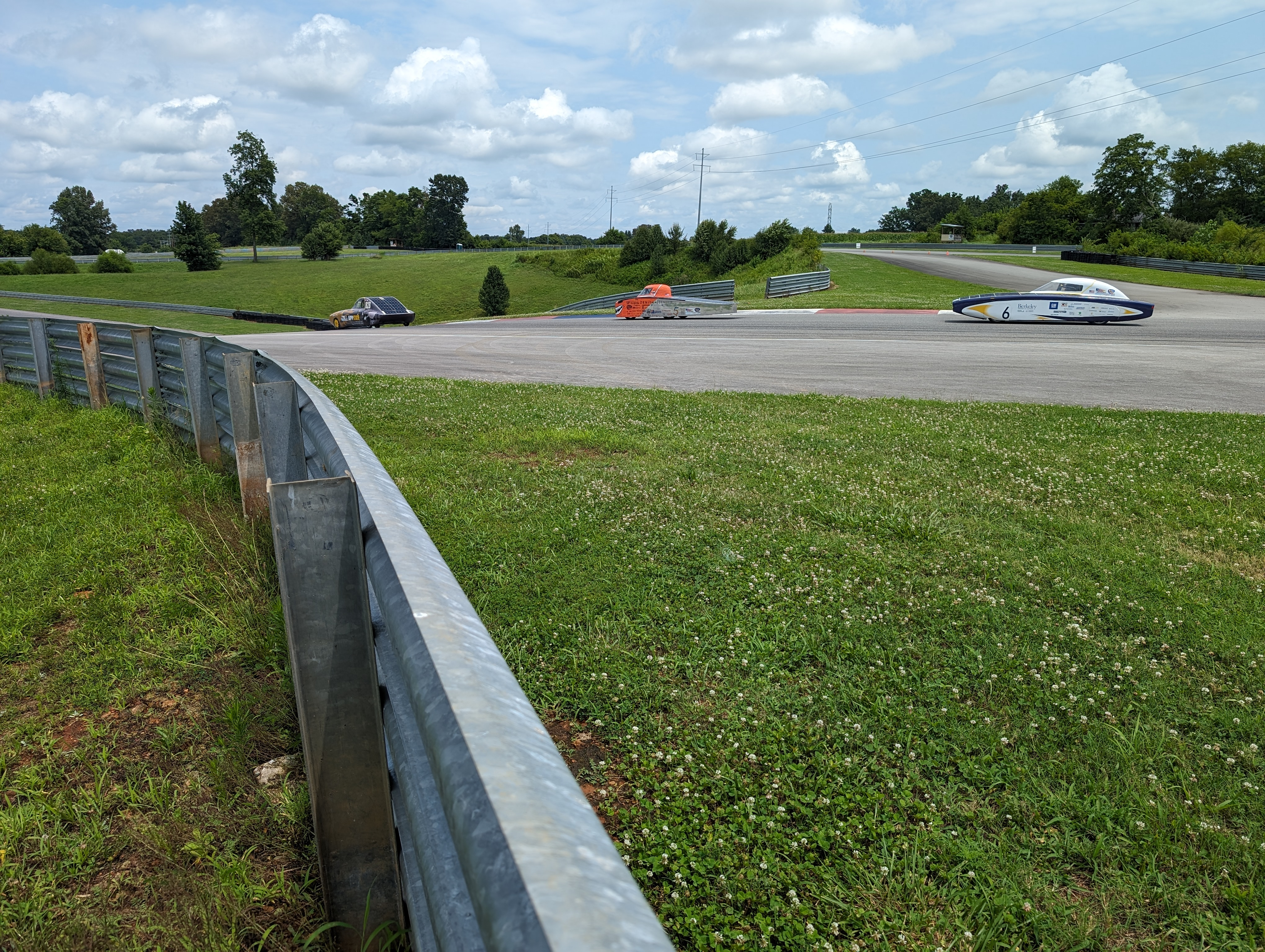
Electrek FSGP 2024. Left to Right: #828 Appalachian State University; #5 University of Florida; #6 University of California, Berkeley

Electrek FSGP 2024 was held at the National Corvette Museum Motorsports Park in Bowling Green, KY from July 16-18th. The 2024 event served as the qualifier for the Electrek American Solar Challenge 2024 which immediately followed FSGP. Difficult weather resulted in many teams not meeting the qualification requirements for ASC with some being granted provisional qualification. The Single Occupant Class was won by team Éclipse from École de technologie supérieure with 215 lap completed for a total of 677.25 miles. The Multi-Occupant Class was also won by a team from Montreal with Project Esteban from Polytechnique Montréal earning the top score of 88.57.

=== 2025 ===
For the second year in a row, Electrek FSGP 2025 was held at the National Corvette Museum Motorsports Park in Bowling Green, KY. It took place between July 3rd-6th, with 33 teams competing in this year's event. The Single Occupant Class was won by team Illini Solar Car from the University of Illinois, with their car Calypso completing 223 laps for a total of 702.5 miles. For the fourth consecutive year, the Multi-Occupant Class was won by team Esteban from Polytechnique Montréal, with a score of 148.4.

=== 2026 ===
The Single Occupant Class was won by team Éclipse from École de technologie supérieure with 347 lap completed for a total of 1075.7 miles. The multi Occupant Classe was won by Georgia Tech with 95.9 Score / 246 Laps.

== See also ==
- List of solar car teams
- List of prototype solar-powered cars

=== Other solar vehicle challenges ===
- American Solar Challenge
- The Solar Car Challenge, an annual event for high school students from the U.S. and (to a lesser extent) other parts of the world; first held in 1995
- South African Solar Challenge, a South African biennial event; first held in 2008
- World Solar Challenge, an Australian biennial world championship solar car race
