= Durham University Solar Car =

Solar car racing team

- Formation: 2002
- Purpose: Development of solar-powered vehicles
- Headquarters: Department of Engineering, Durham University, Durham, United Kingdom
- Website: dusolarcar.org
- Formerly called: Durham University Electric Motorsport (2014-2022) Durham University Solar Car (DUSC) (2002-2014)

Durham University Solar Car, formerly Durham University Electric Motorsport, is a student-run team in the United Kingdom that designs and constructs solar powered cars to compete in international competitions. It is the longest running solar car team in the UK.

== Background ==
Durham University Solar Car is based in the university's School of Engineering, with a team size of around 50 undergraduate students split broadly across mechanical, electrical, electronic and business sub-teams. The team is also strongly supported by graduates and academics within the department with expertise in the fields of solar technology, racing car aerodynamics, direct-drive electrical machines and electrical/hybrid vehicles. Some concepts and features implemented in the vehicles have been developed as part of final year undergraduate projects.

The team was founded as Durham University Solar Car (DUSC) in 2002, and it built its first vehicle in 2004.

=== Competitive History ===
DUSC's first competitive event was the 2008 North American Solar Challenge in which they finished 14th out of 26 competitors, earning the “Best Rookie Team” award. They were the only British team to compete. DUSC also competed in the 2011 Veolia World Solar Challenge race across Australia, qualifying in the top ten & then finishing 33rd out of 42 entrants.

The Durham University Solar Car logo

In 2014 Durham University Solar Car combined with Durham University Formula Student to create Durham University Electric Motorsport (DUEM). DUEM developed a new solar powered vehicle called DUSC 2015, paying homage to the design work carried out while the team was still known as DUSC - DUSC 2015 competed in the 2015 Bridgestone World Solar Challenge.

In 2017, the team headed back to Australia to compete once more with a modified version of DUSC 2015, showing an improvement in performance and completing more than 1000 km on solar power.

In 2019 the team developed Ortus. They competed with this car at the World Solar Challenge, building further on their results of previous events by finishing 14th.

In 2020 the team were planning to attend the 2020 iLumen European Solar Challenge. Due to the COVID-19 pandemic, the team pulled out of competition, but held a hybrid event at RAF Ouston, aiming to complete the distance from their home in Durham, United Kingdom, to Circuit Zolder, Belgium, in the same 24 hours as the official race was being held. This earnt them recognition by organisers in Belgium, who awarded the team the "Hybrid Challenge Award" for their ingenuity.

In 2022, the team rebranded to Durham University Solar Car to represent a closer tie to the university's Department of Engineering, and to reflect an increased focus on solar car design, having not competed in Formula Student in many years. Under the new name, the team developed a new car with the aim of competing in the 2023 Bridgestone World Solar Challenge. The team then attended the event with this new car.

In 2024 the team competed in its first European Solar Challenge, taking a modified 2019 car.

=== Outreach ===
The Team also participates in local community and awareness outreach events, including touring schools and museum exhibitions to promote science, technology and engineering. In 2010, the team ran a successful demonstration event with Cambridge University Eco Racing (CUER).

Due to the COVID-19 Pandemic continuing to prohibit the team from travelling internationally to events, they organised a second outreach campaign, Solar Tour UK (STUK). The team toured UK schools with their car, Ortus, delivering outreach session to students at each school. CUER were again invited, alongside UoN Racing Team and Ardingly Ilfield Solar, to a joint exhibition at Dunsfold Aerodrome at the end of the tour.

== DUSC 2011 ==
=== Specifications ===
Number of Wheels	3 (2 front steered, 1 rear driven)
Solar Array Power	1.4 kW
Solar Cell Efficiency	16%
Maximum Motor Power	5 kW
Maximum Speed	56 mph
Battery Storage Capacity	4.8 kWh
Battery Technology	Lithium iron phosphate
Chassis Construction	Steel space frame
Bodyshell Construction	Carbon fibre

=== Mechanical design ===
The steel space frame chassis was designed using finite element analysis software. The chassis was strong enough to withstand a heavy impact, whilst also being as light as possible. The suspension consisted of racing shock absorbers, with a conventional double wishbone arrangement at the front and a trailing arm at the rear. Special brake calipers were used which retracted to ensure no frictional losses when the brakes were not applied. Specialist solar car tyres were employed to reduce rolling resistance.

=== Electrical design ===
A combination of high-efficiency silicon solar cells and maximum power point trackers were used to extract the maximum possible power from the available solar energy and feed it into a lithium iron phosphate battery pack. The vehicle was driven by a specially designed axial flux wheel motor via a custom controller, resulting in higher efficiency and less transmission loss than conventional electric motors.

=== Electronic design ===
The vehicle made use of a telemetry system operating the CAN protocol to communicate real-time vehicle data over a radio link to a support vehicle. Using this data, the driver could make control adjustments to the vehicle to account for the current performance of the electrical package.

=== Racing as DUSC2008 ===
Substantially the same car was raced both as DUSC2008 across North America and as DUSC2011 across Australia. The major changes between the two are that in 2008 a chain drive was used instead of the in wheel motor, lead acid batteries were used instead of lithium iron, and a commercial solar array was used instead of in-house custom encapsulated panels. There were also numerous other minor changes.

== DUSC 2015 ==
=== Specifications ===
Number of Wheels	4 (2 front steered, 1 rear driven)
Type of Motor	In-hub axial flux brushless DC motor
Solar Array Power	1.4 kW
Solar Array Area	6 m^{2}
Solar Array Technology	Silicon
Solar Cell Efficiency	22.8%
Maximum Motor Power	5 kW
Maximum Speed	70 mph (theoretical)
Battery Storage Capacity	3 kWh
Battery Technology	Lithium iron phosphate
Chassis Construction	Carbon fibre monocoque
Mass	200 kg

=== Mechanical design ===
DUSC 2015 was a Challenger Class solar car designed to compete in the 2015 Bridgestone World Solar Challenge. It was the first vehicle built by DUEM to feature a carbon fibre monocoque, offering significant weight savings over earlier spaceframe designs. Extensive finite element analysis was performed on the chassis to optimise its design and crash safety. The car used a 4-wheeled catamaran configuration, designed to have minimal frontal area to reduce drag.

The car's front suspension was a duolever design, chosen for its favourable packaging requirements. Carbon trailing arm rear suspension is used to reduce unsprung mass. Industrial hydraulic retracting brake calipers were used to minimise mechanical power losses. DUSC 2015 ran on specialist Schwalbe Energiser S tyres, featuring a solar car specific low rolling resistance compound.

=== Electrical design ===
DUSC 2015 had a 6 m^{2} solar array, using high-efficiency cells from Gochermann Solar Technology. The array was capable of providing 1.4 kW at peak sunlight, which could drive the motor directly or feed excess power into the lithium iron phosphate battery pack.

The car used a bespoke in-hub brushless motor designed and manufactured in Durham University. The axial flux machine was a derivative of a concept first designed in 2011, optimised to give a peak efficiency of 98%, and develops a maximum power of 5 kW. The machine drove the rear left wheel of the vehicle only, which was made possible by the vehicle's asymmetric weight distribution.

=== Electronic design ===
To capture as much telemetry data as possible, custom circuitry termed 'sensor nodes' were developed. Sensor nodes were designed so they can all communicate to each other across the length of the vehicle, as well as each individual node being able to interface with over 20 different sensors each. This also allowed some data to be relayed to the driver via the dashboard.

== DUSC (2017) ==
=== Specifications ===
Number of Wheels	4 (2 front steered, 1 rear driven)
Type of Motor	In-hub axial flux brushless DC machine
Solar Array Power	1 kW
Solar Array Area	4 m^{2}
Solar Array Technology	Silicon
Solar Cell Efficiency	22.8%
Maximum Motor Power	5 kW
Maximum Speed	68 mph
Battery Storage Capacity	3 kWh
Battery Technology	Lithium-ion
Chassis Construction	Carbon fibre monocoque
Mass	250 kg

=== Mechanical design ===
The 2017 car from DUEM, simply called 'DUSC', was a heavily modified version of DUSC 2015. While several aspects (such as the monocoque, powertrain, and wheels) remained unchanged from the 2015 car, changes were made both to improve performance and comply with new regulations introduced for Challenger-class vehicles in the 2017 Bridgestone World Solar Challenge.

To improve handling characteristics and stability, the car used a new version of the duolever front suspension. While this contributed an overall increase in weight, other changes such as optimizing the trailing arm shape mitigated the effects. To reduce drag, wheel covers were used on the existing rims.

=== Electrical design ===
In line with 2017 regulations, the solar array area of DUSC was 4 m^{2} (down from 6 m^{2}) using the same cells as DUSC 2015. This fed the motor (largely unchanged from the previous iteration), as well as a new lithium-ion battery, which represented a significant weight saving.

=== Electronics design ===
The car used a new driver dashboard, allowing the driver to obtain real-time telemetry information directly as well as improving layout and ergonomics. Changes were also made to the exterior lights to comply with regulations, increasing indicator and brakelight visibility.

== Ortus (2019) & Ortus-T ==
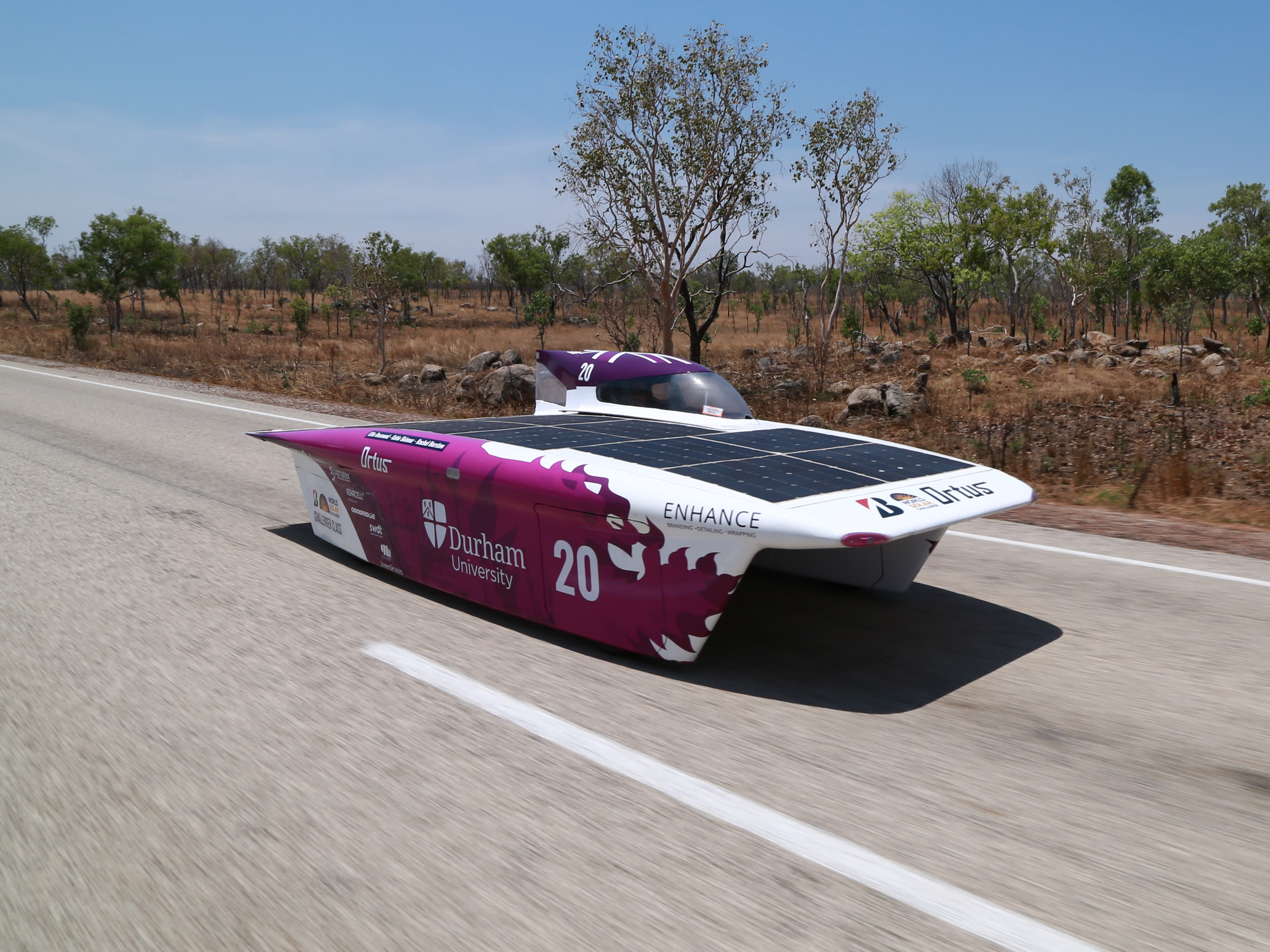
Ortus as pictured in the Australian Outback, competing in the Bridgestone World Solar Challenge 2019

The team's solar car for 2019, named "Ortus," was designed and built from scratch for the Bridgestone World Solar Challenge 2019.

=== Specifications ===
Number of Wheels	4 (2 front steered, 1 rear driven)
Type of Motor	In-hub axial flux brushless DC machine
Solar Array Power	1 kW
Solar Array Area	4 m^{2}
Solar Array Technology	Silicon
Solar Cell Efficiency	22.8%
Maximum Motor Power	5 kW
Maximum Speed	68 mph
Battery Storage Capacity	5 kWh
Battery Technology	Lithium-ion
Chassis Construction	Carbon fibre monocoque
Mass	178 kg

=== Mechanical Design ===
Ortus is a 4 wheeled asymmetric catamaran. It is left hand drive. The battery is situated in-between the two off side wheels of the car.

The front wheels are both steered. Due to how narrow both vertically drafted aerofoils of the car are, sections of bodywork open to allow for the steering to achieve full lock without the tyres rubbing on the internal surface of the car. The front suspension is double wishbone, and the rear suspension are both carbon fibre forked trailing arm. The rear left wheel is powered. Wheels were metal and ran Schwalbe tyres.

=== Electrical Design ===
The vehicle was designed specifically for a 4 m^{2} solar collector, using the same solar cells as was used on the 2017 car. This would be the third event for the solar cells used on Ortus. Energy storage was provided by 420 18650 lithium-ion cells.

Durham continued to produce their own motors to be run on the 2019 car, electrically similar to the 2017 entrant's powertrain, but featuring sculpted backirons.

=== Electronics Design ===
Electronics design remained largely unchanged from 2017 with no large regulation changes between the events. The same dashboard setup was carried between cars.

=== Ortus-T (2024) ===
The 2019 car was modified for the iLumen European Solar Challenge 2024, with headlights added to allow for the overnight section of the 24-hour event. Suspension was modified to allow the car to run Bridgestone Enliten tyres, but followed the same philosophy. The rear right wheel was also powered alongside the rear left for the event.

== DUSC2023 ==
DUSC2023 is a 3 wheeled asymmetric catamaran designed specifically for the 2023 Bridgestone World Solar Challenge.

Number of Wheels	3 (2 front steered, 1 rear driven)
Type of Motor	In-hub axial flux brushless DC machine
Solar Array Power	1 kW
Solar Array Area	4 m^{2}
Solar Array Technology	Silicon
Solar Cell Efficiency	22.8%
Maximum Motor Power	5 kW
Maximum Speed	100 km/h (62 mph)
Battery Storage Capacity	5 kWh
Battery Technology	Lithium-ion
Chassis Construction	Carbon fibre monocoque
Mass	180 kg

=== Mechanical design ===
The competition reintroduced 3 wheels from the 2021 regulation set, whilst introducing the 'PVC Pat' mannequin for occupant cell volume. This gave the 2023 car a larger occupant cell than previous vehicles. Despite this, the driver side of the vehicle follows similar design cues to the 2019 vehicle. The off side of the vehicle features a single steered wheel positioned longitudinally between the driver side wheels. To allow for full Ackermann steering the off side wheel steers to a lesser extent than the front driver side wheel.

The steered wheels are both double wishbone suspension, and the rear wheel is a carbon fibre forked trailing arm to receive a through axle motor. Wheels are GHCraft's carbon fibre solar car wheels, which mount Bridgestone Enliten solar car tyres by the World Solar Challenge's title sponsor for the event, Bridgestone.

The car features a sloped array/body aerofoil profile, making the off side of the car noticeably lower than the driver side. This is claimed to improve both aerodynamics of the car and increase solar collection over the course of the race.

The vehicle is left hand drive.

=== Electrical design ===
The 2023 regulations allowed for 4 m^{2} of solar collectors which the vehicle obeys using 257 166 mm silicon photovoltaic cells bought new for this car. These are Gochermann encapsulated panels in bespoke arrangements to fit the geometry of the car.

Battery capacity is unchanged from 2019, using 420 18650 lithium-ion cells.

DUSC2023 used both an in-house and an externally supplied motor over the course of the 2023 event. The supplied motor was produced by Marand, which matched the in-hub axial flux design of Durham's self-built motors. In-house motors had to be modified to change the rim profile to accept wider Bridgestone tyres, but were again electrically unchanged.

=== Electronics design ===
2023 required Challenger and Cruiser class vehicles to have daytime running lights which the vehicle integrates into the same light housings as its front indicators. Battery safe state regulations also meant a change to how the car was powered on.

The dashboard again resembled the car's predecessors in layout and functionality.

== Competitions ==
Year	Race	Car	Car Number	Entrants	Final Position	Achievements
2008	North American Solar Challenge	DUSC2008	175	24	14	First competitive race Best Rookie Team
2011	World Solar Challenge	DUSC2011	14	42	33	
2015	World Solar Challenge	DUSC2015	26	41	DNF	
2017	World Solar Challenge	DUSC	20	40	36	
2019	World Solar Challenge	Ortus	20	40	14	
2020	European Solar Challenge	Ortus	20	-	-	Hybrid Challenge Award
2023	World Solar Challenge	DUSC2023	20	36	11	First UK entrant to complete the event within 6 days
2024	European Solar Challenge	Ortus-T	20	17	9	National Champions: United Kingdom
2026	European Solar Challenge	Ortus-T	20	24	9	National Champions: United Kingdom

== Sponsors ==
The team have been largely supported by external sponsors throughout their history, including:

- Durham University
- GREEN AXXE
- Climb Online
- Evonik Industries
- Sevcon
- iMechE
- Kensington Capital
- GH Cityprint
- DJI
- Labman
- Fobo
- The Royal Navy
- Sigmatex
- Tufnol Composites
- Robert Cupitt
- Gochermann
- Altair HyperWorks
- Eurocircuits
- Designs Unique

Former sponsors include:

- Institution of Engineering and Technology
- Gurit
- Deloitte
- Durham University Engineering Society
- Energy Institute
- RS Components
- C&D Technologies
- EPSRC
- Jaguar Land Rover.

== See also ==
- Durham University School of Engineering
- World Solar Challenge
- North American Solar Challenge
- List of solar car teams
