= John Craven (economist) =

British economist

1st Chair of University Alliance
- In office 2006–2009
- Preceded by: Position established
- Succeeded by: Janet Beer

Vice-chancellor of the University of Portsmouth
- In office 1 January 1997 – 31 August 2013
- Succeeded by: Graham Galbraith

Personal details
- Born: 17 June 1949 (age 77)
- Education: King's College, Cambridge; Massachusetts Institute of Technology
- Profession: Educator

John Anthony George Craven CBE (born 17 June 1949) is a British economist, a former vice-chancellor of the University of Portsmouth. In 2006, he founded the University Alliance, and served as its first chair until 2009.

== Early life ==
John Craven was educated at Pinner County Grammar School, then King's College, Cambridge where he read Mathematics and Economics and then took up a Kennedy Scholarship to the Massachusetts Institute of Technology.

== Career ==
He went to University of Kent at Canterbury where he spent 25 years, first as a member of the Economics Department and then in a variety of senior management roles. He was promoted to Reader in Economics in 1980 and Professor in 1986. In 1987 he was elected Dean of the Faculty of Social Sciences; a position which he held for four years. He became Pro Vice-Chancellor in 1991 and Deputy Vice-Chancellor in 1993 when he had responsibility for planning and resource allocation.

=== Vice-Chancellor of Portsmouth University ===
He was appointed as vice-chancellor at the University of Portsmouth and took up that position on 1 January 1997. His inaugural lecture on taking up the position of Vice-Chancellor at the University of Portsmouth brought together his main interests in social choice theory and reflected on the relevance of that theory to the issues of accountability facing Vice-Chancellors and others in publicly funded organisations.

Craven was appointed Commander of the Order of the British Empire (CBE) in the 2013 Birthday Honours for services to higher education and to the community in Hampshire.

=== Research ===
John Craven's main academic interests lie in theoretical economics and the theory of social choice. He has published three books including a well-known textbook on introductory economics which has been widely used in schools, colleges and universities.

=== Founder of University Alliance ===
Vice-Chancellor Craven founded the University Alliance in 2006, and served as its chair until 2009. The University Alliance, previously convened informally as the Alliance of Non-Aligned Universities, comprises a mixture of pre and post 1992 universities, which are not members of the other mission groups; the Russell Group, the 94 Group or Million Plus. In August 2009 he was replaced as chair by the vice-chancellor of Oxford Brookes University, Professor Janet Beer.

== Personal life ==
In 1974 he married Laura Loftis; they have a son and daughter.

Preceded by -	Chairman of the University Alliance; 2006–2009	Succeeded by Professor Janet Beer
