= Steve West (podiatrist) =

British podiatrist

Sir Steve West CBE DL FRSM FRSA FRCPodM
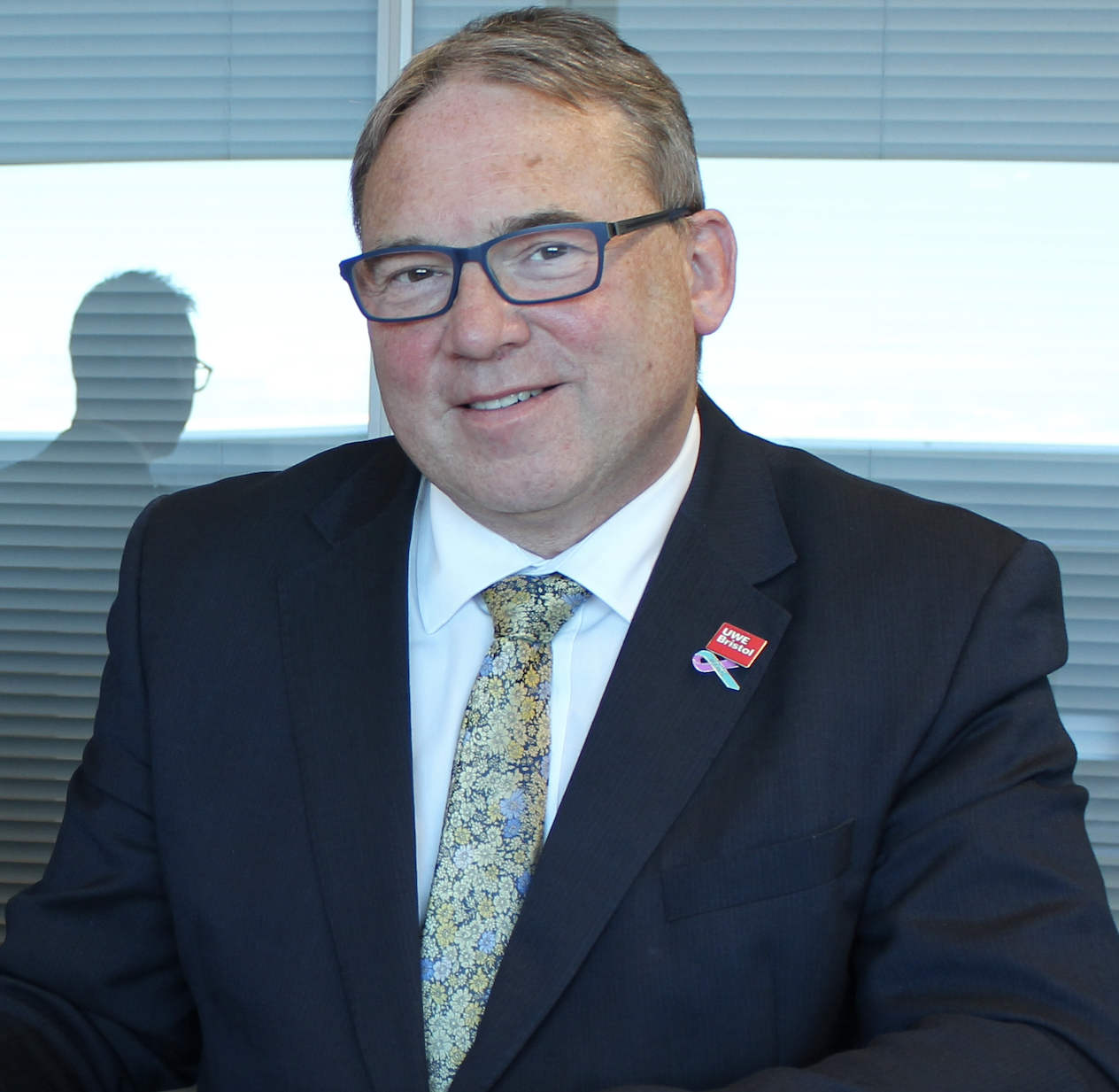

3rd Chairman of the University Alliance
- In office 2012–2016
- Preceded by: Janet Beer
- Succeeded by: John Latham

Vice-chancellor of the University of the West of England
- Incumbent
- Assumed office January 2008
- Preceded by: Sir Howard Newby

Personal details
- Born: Steven George West; March 1961 (age 65) London, England
- Education: University of Westminster

Sir Steven George West CBE DL FRSM FRSA FRCPodM (born March 1961) is a British podiatrist, the vice-chancellor, president and chief executive officer of the University of the West of England since 2008. He holds a number of national and international advisory appointments in higher education, healthcare policy and regional government.

== Career ==
West trained as a podiatrist and podiatric surgeon in London, working in the NHS and private/commercial sector from 1982. He entered academia in 1984 as a lecturer, then senior lecturer, at The Chelsea School of Chiropody and Podiatric Medicine, The London Foot Hospital and Westminster University. He developed his research interests at King’s College London in the Department of Bioengineering. In 1990 he took up a post as Associate Dean and Head of the Department of Podiatry at Huddersfield University, and became Dean of the School of Health and Behavioural Sciences in 1992.

In 1995 he joined the University of the West of England as Dean of the Faculty of Health and Social Care and Professor of Health and Social Care. In this post he merged three Colleges of Health into a new faculty, establishing one of the largest faculties of Health and Social Care in the UK.

In 2005, Professor West became Pro Vice-Chancellor at the university, with the planning and resources portfolio. Then in 2006 he became Deputy Vice-Chancellor and was later appointed Acting Vice-Chancellor in August 2007. In May 2008 he took up post as Vice-Chancellor, at the age of 46.

In 2018 West was criticised for claiming over £43,000 in expenses for items like chauffeur-driven car trips to London in an 18 month period.

He is a Fellow of the Royal Society of Medicine, Fellow of the Faculty of Podiatric Medicine of the Royal College of Podiatry (FRCPodM) and Fellow of the Royal Society of Arts.

=== Other roles ===
In June 2013, West was appointed as the first chair of the West of England Academic Health Science Network. The network is one of 15 across the country that promote innovation in the National Health Service, bringing together bodies including health commissioners and providers, universities, and industry.

Professor West is chair of the UK Mental Health in Higher Education Advisory Group and a non-executive director of Bristol, North Somerset and South Gloucestershire Integrated Care Board. He is currently the president of Universities UK, 2021–2023.

From 2017 to 2021, West was chair of the West of England Local Enterprise Partnership, and consequently a non-voting member of the West of England Combined Authority (WECA).

West's other previous external commitments include non-executive director for the Office for Students, chair of University Alliance, president of Bristol chamber of commerce, chair of the West of England Initiative, and president of the South West CBI. He also served as President for the Anchor Society, a charity for the care of older people in the Bristol area, in 2018.

== Personal life ==
West's leisure-time interests include scuba diving.

West has been a member of The Society of Merchant Venturers since 2014.

== Honours ==
West was appointed Commander of the Order of the British Empire (CBE) in the 2017 New Year Honours for services to higher education and was made a deputy lieutenant of Gloucestershire in 2012.

He received honorary degrees from the University of Bristol (Doctor of Laws, 2014) and Taylor’s University, Malaysia (2016, Doctor of Education).

He was knighted in the 2023 Birthday Honours for services to health and education.

Academic offices
Preceded by Howard Newby	Vice Chancellor of the University of the West of England; 2008–present	Succeeded by Incumbent
Preceded by Janet Beer	Chairman of the University Alliance; 2012–2016	Succeeded by John Latham
