= School of Architecture, Oxford Brookes University =

Coordinates: 51.7546°N 1.2228°W

Oxford School of Architecture Oxford Brookes University
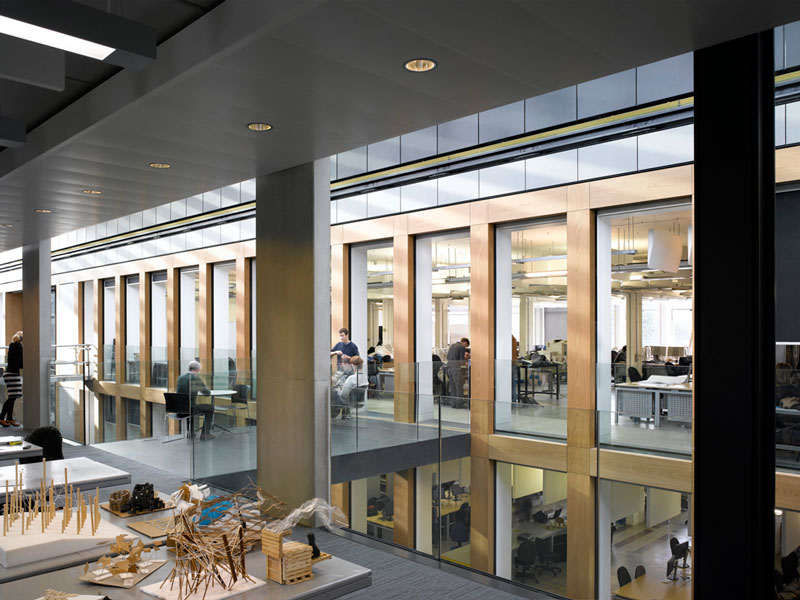
- Type: School of Architecture
- Established: 1927
- Parent institution: Oxford Brookes University
- Affiliations: RIBA; ARB
- Head of School: Christina Godiksen
- Students: 700
- Location: Oxford, England
- Campus: Headington
- Website: architecture.brookes.ac.uk

The Oxford School of Architecture is a school of architecture at Oxford Brookes University in Oxford, England. Founded in 1927 by John Henry Brookes. it is one of the largest architecture schools in the United Kingdom, with around 300 students and 70 staff. The school has become one of the most competitive architecture schools, ranking in the top 50 Architecture schools in the world in the 2015 QS World University Rankings.

The school also houses the RIBA Studio a program facilitated by the Royal Institute of British Architects (RIBA) to facilitate the registration of architects who are working in the field of architecture within the United Kingdom.

== History ==
The school was formed in 1927 by a small group of architects in Oxford, following a rejection from the University of Oxford to establish an architecture school in the city, due to the aftermath of the 1926 United Kingdom General Strike. The architects then approached John Henry Brookes, who agreed to form the school, named the Oxford School of Architecture. There were three students, two women and one man. One woman left after the first year to get married, but the school grew to one of the largest in the country. The department also have a society called the Doric Club founded the same year as the school itself in 1927.

The school is validated by the Royal Institute of British Architects, and the Architects Registration Board

== Specialist study ==
Centre for Development and Emergency Practice. CENDEP was awarded the Queen's Anniversary Prize and is well known for its program for humanitarian practitioners, some of which are delivered in cooperation with UNITAR. CENDEP provides an academic setting for the study of cities, humanitarianism and refugees. Singer and activist Annie Lennox is patron of the Master's Course in Development and Emergency Practice.

== Oxford Architecture Society ==
The school has a student-run society called the Oxford Architecture Society also known as 'OxArch'. It hosts a variety of guest lectures, workshops, competitions, films and socials throughout the academic year.

== OSA Magazine ==
Established in 2014 and published three times a year, the student-led OSA magazine offers a platform for students to publish original and edited articles and projects related to the theme of each issue. The magazine was founded by post-graduate students Rob Dutton and Lauren Kehoe. Subsequent editors include Adrian Alexandrescu (2015–2016), James Barrell (2016–2017), Sonia Tong (2016–2017), Jing Zhi Tan (2017-2018), Kate Ridgway (2017-2018), Maria Mavrikou (2017-2018) and Robert Antony Cresswell (2017-2018). The magazine is supported by Robin Partington and Partners and Assael Architecture

== Heads of School ==
- Stephen Bertram (1929-1938)
- Edwin Marshal Rice (1938-1948)
- William Taylor (Interim) (1952-1954)
- Reginald Cave (1954-1976)
- Robert Maguire (1976-1986)
- Christopher Cross (1986-1999)
- Richard Hayward (Interim) (2000-2001)
- John Stevenson (2001-2002)
- Mike Jenks (2002–2005)
- Mark Swenarton (2005–2010)
- Matt Gaskin (2010–2020)
- Christina Godiksen (2021-)

== Notable staff ==
- Prof. David Greene (Archigram)
- David Grindley
- Prof. Rajat Gupta – Professor of Architecture and Climate Change
- Prof. Nabeel Hamdi – Author, humanitarian and winner of UN Habitat’s Scroll of Honour
- Andrew Holmes – Artist
- Prof. Mike Jenks – Emeritus Professor, Co-founder of OISD
- Prof. Paul Oliver MBE – Vernacular encyclopaedia
- John Stevenson – Deputy Head of Architecture and Head of Design (Architecture)
- Christopher Nash – Managing Partner of Grimshaw Architects

== Notable alumni ==
- Yasmeen Lari – First woman architect in Pakistan and advisor to UNESCO
- Graham Stirk – Partner of Rogers Stirk Harbour + Partners practice of Richard Rogers
- Charlie Luxton – Broadcaster/architectural designer
- Dr Hugo Slim – Author and chief scholar at the Centre for Humanitarian Dialogue in Switzerland and former trustee of Oxfam
- Andrew Logan – sculptor and performance artist

== Honorary ==
- Louis Hellman
- Kevin McCloud
- Chris Wilkinson
- Peter Clegg
- Bill Dunster
- Stuart Parker
- Richard Rogers
- Doreen Laurence
