= Howard Newby =

British sociologist

Sir Howard Newby

Vice-Chancellor of the University of Liverpool
- In office 2008–2014
- Preceded by: Sir Drummond Bone
- Succeeded by: Janet Beer

Vice-Chancellor of the University of the West of England
- In office 2006–2008
- Preceded by: Alfred Morris
- Succeeded by: Steve West

Vice-Chancellor of the University of Southampton
- In office 1994–2001
- Preceded by: Sir Gordon Higginson
- Succeeded by: Bill Wakeham

Personal details
- Born: Howard Joseph Newby; 10 December 1947 (age 78) Derby, England
- Children: 2
- Education: University of Essex

Sir Howard Joseph Newby, CBE DL SBS (born 10 December 1947) is a British sociologist. He was appointed vice-chancellor of the University of Liverpool in 2008 and retired in December 2014. He was vice-chancellor of the University of Southampton from 1994 to 2001. He was appointed as the vice-chancellor of the University of the West of England (UWE), from March 2006. After 15 months at UWE he moved to the University of Liverpool and was almost immediately put on "gardening leave" at UWE for the duration of his year-long notice period, with the then deputy vice-chancellor, Steve West, acting up to the VC role before his subsequent substantive appointment. On 11 February 2014, it was announced that Newby would retire from his role as vice-chancellor of Liverpool in 2015.

== Early life ==
He grew up in Derbyshire, going to John Port Grammar School in Etwall, before attending Atlantic College, an independent (private) residential sixth form college in Wales, as a scholarship student. He attended the University of Essex where he gained a BA and PhD.

== Career ==
His other academic posts include professor of sociology at the University of Essex and visiting appointments in Australia and the United States. From 1980 to 1983 he was professor of sociology and rural sociology at the University of Wisconsin–Madison.

In August 2001, Newby ended a two-year term as president of Universities UK, the UK body which represents the university sector. His year-long presidency of the British Association ended in September 2002. He was appointed as the Chief Executive of The Higher Education Funding Council for England (HEFCE) in October 2001. He served as President of the Academy of Social Sciences from 2008 to 2013. He is a director of the Universities Superannuation Scheme Limited, and chair of trustees for NatCen Social Research.

Newby has published many books and articles on social change in rural England, and was for eight years a Rural Development Commissioner, a member of the government body responsible for the economic and social regeneration of rural England. From 1983 to 1988 he was director of the ESRC Data Archive, a national facility for storing and disseminating computerised datasets for use by researchers in the public and private sectors.

In November 2008, Newby announced plans to transform Liverpool University into a centre for "knowledge exchange", opening a graduate school in India. In January 2009, academics and trade unions at Liverpool were reported as expressing unease at planned restructuring, the offer of voluntary redundancy to all staff and the use of a private company Spirit of Creation (previously used at UWE) in circumventing "established structures and procedures in pushing the plan through". There was also concern at what was perceived to be a shift away from humanities and social sciences towards science, where research income was potentially higher.

== Recent events ==
In January 2010 the blogging platform WordPress suspended a number of blogs which it hosted after claims by the director of legal services at the University of Liverpool, Kevan Ryan, that some posts on them defamed Newby.

== Personal life ==
He was married first in 1970 to Janet Elizabeth Craddock and they had two sons. The marriage was dissolved in 2003. He was married, secondly, in 2005 to Sheila Mary Mann and has one stepson and one stepdaughter.

Newby was awarded a CBE in 1995 for his services to social science and a knighthood in 2000 for his services to higher education. He is a member of the Railway Heritage Committee and trustee of Swindon Steam Railway Museum. He was awarded the Hong Kong Silver Bauhinia Star (SBS) in 2021.

== Bibliography ==
- 1977 The Deferential Worker: a Study of Farm Workers in East Anglia. London: Allen Lane. ISBN 978-0-7139-0892-3
- 1980 Green and Pleasant Land?: Social Change in Rural England. Harmondsworth: Penguin. ISBN 978-0-14-022252-4
- 1987 Country Life: a Social History of Rural England. London: Weidenfeld and Nicolson. ISBN 978-0-297-79063-1
- 1988 The Countryside in Question. London: Hutchinson. ISBN 978-0-09-173104-5
- 1989 (with David Rose, Gordon Marshall, Carol Vogler). Social Class in Modern Britain. London; Boston: Unwin Hyman. ISBN 978-0-415-09876-2
- 1995 (with D. Lee). The Problem of Sociology: an Introduction to the Discipline. London; New York: Routledge. ISBN 978-0-415-09453-5
- 1995 National Trust: The Next Hundred Years London: National Trust ISBN 978-0-7078-0231-2

== See also ==
- List of University of Southampton people

Academic offices
Preceded by Sir Gordon Higginson	Vice-Chancellor of the University of Southampton; 1994–2001	Succeeded by Bill Wakeham
Preceded by Alfred Morris	Vice-Chancellor of the University of the West of England; 2006–2008	Succeeded by Steve West
Preceded by Sir Drummond Bone	Vice-Chancellor of the University of Liverpool; 2008–2014	Succeeded by Janet Beer
