= Department of Engineering, Durham University =

Academic department of Durham University

Coordinates: 54°46′2″N 1°34′12″W

Department of Engineering
- Type: Engineering school
- Established: 1837 (original); 1965 (current)
- Parent institution: Durham University
- Head of Department: Charles Augarde
- Undergraduates: 176 per year
- Postgraduates: 70 per year
- Doctoral students: 100 per year
- Location: Durham, England
- Website: dur.ac.uk/engineering

The Department of Engineering is the engineering school at Durham University in Durham, England, United Kingdom.

Relevant undergraduate programmes are accredited by the Institution of Mechanical Engineers, the Institution of Engineering and Technology, and the Institution of Civil Engineers and the Institution of Structural Engineers. This means that the degrees offered by the School are recognised as meeting the academic requirements for progression to Chartered Engineer status.

== History ==
The current department of engineering is the third to be established at Durham University. The first school of engineering in the British Isles was established at Durham in 1837 under the leadership of James Finlay Weir Johnston and Temple Chevallier, taking its first students in January 1838. The three-year course led to the academic rank of Civil Engineer, first awarded in 1840. However, demand fell off and the last students from this first school of engineering graduated in 1852.

Following the establishment of the Durham University College of Physical Sciences in Newcastle in 1871, the engineering course re-opened in the 1880s, again awarding the title of Civil Engineer from 1887 until this was converted into a BSc course in engineering in 1894. The first professorship in engineering was established at the College of Sciences in 1891, endowed by local philanthropist George Henderson.

This second department of engineering transferred, with the rest of the Newcastle division of Durham University, to the newly established Newcastle University in 1963. The current department was established in Durham in 1965 by the vice-chancellor and warden, Derman Christopherson, himself an engineer. The initial staff consisted of two professors: Russell Hoyle, professor of engineering science, and Gordon Higginson, professor of civil engineering science, along with J. J. Bates, reader in electrical engineering science, and Mike Holgate, lecturer in engineering science.

The Master of Engineering (MEng) course was introduced in 1980 as a postgraduate master's course.

In 1982, the Department of Engineering Science became the Department of Engineering, then the School of Engineering and Applied Science in 1985 following a merger with the Department of Applied Physics (established in 1960). In 1991 this became the School of Engineering and Computer Science following a merger with the Department of Computing (established in 1975), these then separated again in 1994 before re-merging in 2009 and separating once more in 2017 to leave the current Department of Engineering.

== Academic profile ==
At undergraduate level, the department offers four year Master of Engineering (MEng) and three year Bachelor of Engineering (BEng) courses. The main courses offered by the department are in general engineering, but it also offers specialised courses in aeronautical engineering, bioengineering and renewable energy (only at MEng level) and civil, electrical, electronic and mechanical engineering (at both MEng and BEng level). All of the courses follow the same general engineering curriculum for the first two years.

The department offers taught Master of Science (MSc) courses in a variety of subjects, as well as Master of Science by Research and Doctor of Philosophy degrees. The department also collaborates with Durham University Business School on a Master of Science in Energy Engineering Management, introduced in 2023.

Tony Roskilly, Chair of Energy Systems in the department, leads the UK National Clean Maritime Research Hub, a consortium of thirteen universities selected by the UK Government in 2023 to lead research into reducing pollution and carbon emissions from maritime industries.

== Student activities ==
The Durham University Solar Car was established in 2002. In 2023, the car completed the 3,000-kilometre (1,900-mile) Bridgestone World Solar Challenge race in Australia, finishing 11th. The department's solar car is one of two in Britain (the other being Cambridge University Eco Racing) to be directly sponsored by Bridgestone.

Students regularly compete in the Design Challenge competition hosted by the Institution of Mechanical Engineers. Durham was the national champion in 2018 and won the national poster prize and presentation prize in 2019 and 2022.

== Notable people ==
Staff:

- Sir Derman Christopherson
- Sir Gordon Higginson
- Michael Sterling
- Karen Johnson

Alumni:

- Carla Denyer (MEng, 2009)

== See also ==
- Durham University Solar Car
