= University Alliance =

Association of British universities

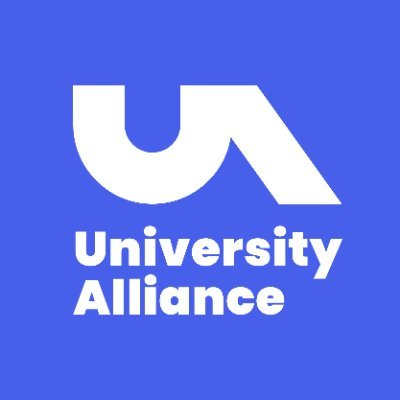
- Abbreviation: UA
- Formation: 2006; 20 years ago
- Type: Association of United Kingdom-based universities
- Legal status: Association
- Location: Coventry University London
- Region served: United Kingdom
- Members: 20
- Chair: Professor Roderick Watkins, Anglia Ruskin University
- CEO: Vanessa Wilson
- Website: unialliance.ac.uk
- Formerly called: Alliance of Non-Aligned Universities

University Alliance (UA) is an association of British universities formed in 2006 as the Alliance of Non-Aligned Universities, adopting its current name in 2007.

Its membership is made up of technical, research-oriented and professional universities with a mission to drive growth and innovation in Britain's cities and regions through research, teaching and enterprise activity, with a particular focus on links with business and industry and applied research with real-world impact.

== Overview ==
Alliance institutions educate almost a quarter of UK undergraduate students, including 25% of those on STEM courses and 41% of all part-time students. They deliver 39% of the UK's sandwich degrees with a year's experience in industry and maintain links with over 16,000 businesses, including 11,000 SMEs. It is the only UK university association or grouping which is above benchmark on both access and retention of students. A large proportion of courses (43%) offered by Alliance universities are accredited by professional bodies.

In 2015, University Alliance launched the Doctoral Training Alliance, the UK's largest multi-partner doctoral training programme building on its members' research strengths and industry-focused ethos. The initial programme in applied biosciences for health was followed with further programmes, focused on energy and social policy. In 2018, with a €6.5million award from the European Commission, this programme was expanded to include international students, with the launch of the extended Doctoral Training Alliance, DTA3/COFUND. In 2017 it began a Teaching Excellence Alliance programme focused on professional development, sharing best practice and innovation in industry-engaged teaching and developing students' social capital.

Alliance universities employ over 20,000 research staff and account for more than a fifth of teams undertaking world-leading (4*) research in health, general engineering and art and design, according to the most recent Research Excellence Framework. In student enterprise, 40% of the UK's successful graduate start-ups – those surviving beyond three years – come from Alliance graduates and collectively graduate start-ups from Alliance universities employ more than 8,000 people and account for £172m in annual turnover.

University Alliance has an ongoing partnership with the Australian Technology Network group of universities, following a memorandum of understanding signed in 2013. In 2017 a delegation took place to strengthen links between the two groups. A pitchbook document promoting UK excellence in degree-level technical and professional education to international audiences was published by University Alliance in October 2017, developed in collaboration with the British Council, the Department for International Trade and the UK government's GREAT Britain campaign.

== Policy ==
In 2016 University Alliance published a series of reports on the leadership role of universities as 'anchor institutions' in their cities and regions, supporting health and wellbeing, life chances, skills, widening participation in HE and innovation. In February 2017, University Alliance put forward proposals on lifelong learning, calling on the government to take steps to ensure people can benefit from educational opportunities at all stages of life. Following this, ministers announced funding for pilot projects to test new approaches to lifelong learning in the March 2017 Budget.

Its policy work has also focused on the role of universities in supporting the UK's industrial strategy and nurturing arts, culture and the creative economy. University Alliance's proposals for accelerated degrees and for the creation of Research England within UKRI with knowledge exchange explicitly recognised within its remit have been adopted by the government as part of the Higher Education and Research Act. The organisation has also shaped the design and methodology of the next Research Excellence Framework, REF 2021, following a government-commissioned review by Lord Stern.

Following the EU referendum, in August 2016 University Alliance highlighted the need for an effective post-Brexit replacement for EU Structural Funds as the UK leaves the EU, with £100m of ERDF and ESF monies focused on boosting skills and raising productivity in less prosperous regions being channelled each year through universities. This was subsequently reflected in the recommendations of the House of Commons Education Committee's report Exiting the UK: Challenges and Opportunities for UK Higher Education in April 2017 and in UK government proposals for a 'Shared Prosperity Fund'.

University Alliance has also undertaken policy work to understand and define teaching excellence in the context of professional and technical education: a collection of essays published by the organisation in 2017, Technical and Professional Excellence: Perspectives on Learning and Teaching included contributions from the National Union of Students, Confederation of British Industry, British Council Chief executive Sir Ciarán Devane, Office for Students Chair Sir Michael Barber and others.

In December 2017 the findings of The Hidden Story, an AHRC-funded study on university knowledge exchange with the creative industries were published, having been undertaken by Alliance universities. It mapped the ways in which higher education institutions support the sector and build cultural infrastructure contributing to understanding of this activity and how it can be measured.

University Alliance contributed to Vocation, Vocation, Vocation, a report on BTEC qualifications as a route into HE, published by the Social Market Foundation in association with Pearson in January 2018. In the foreword to the report, University Alliance Treasurer and Vice-Chancellor of Nottingham Trent University Prof Edward Peck emphasised the contribution which vocational qualifications had made to social mobility, meeting employers' skills needs and as a preparation for technical and professional degree courses.

Tackling barriers to the expansion of degree apprenticeships has been a key area of focus for University Alliance, with the organisation hosting a speech by Education Committee Chair and former Skills Minister Robert Halfon MP in April 2018 addressing this.

In its June 2018 report Ladders of Opportunity the organisation highlighted the role of universities in delivering education from Level 4 and Level 5 (sub-degree qualifications) up to Level 8 (postgraduate) of the Qualifications and Credit Framework (QCF). The report made a series of recommendations, including greater recognition of achievement at Level 5 within degrees, of experiential learning after completing a degree and greater flexibility in funding and in the delivery of the final year of a degree.

== Members ==
University	Current vice-chancellor^{a}
Anglia Ruskin University	Roderick Watkins
Birmingham City University	David Mba
Bournemouth University	Alison Honour
University of Brighton	Donna Whitehead
Coventry University	John Latham
De Montfort University	Katie Normington
University of Derby	Kathryn Mitchell
University of Greenwich	Jane Harrington
Glasgow Caledonian University	Mairi Watson
University of Hertfordshire	Anthony Woodman
Kingston University	Steven Spier
Leeds Beckett University	Peter Slee
Middlesex University	Shân Wareing
Oxford Brookes University	Helen Laville
Robert Gordon University	Steve Olivier
University of South Wales	Osama Khan
Teesside University	Mark Simpson
University of West London	Peter John
University of the West of England	Steven West
University of Westminster	Dibyesh Anand (Interim)

== Leadership ==
=== Chair of University Alliance ===
No.	Chair	Term	University
1	John Craven	2006–2009	University of Portsmouth
2	Janet Beer	2009–2012	Oxford Brookes University
3	Steven West	2012–2016	University of the West of England
4	John Latham	2016–2019	Coventry University
5	Debra Humphris	2019 - 2023	University of Brighton
6	Jane Harrington	2023-2026	University of Greenwich
7	Roderick Watkins	2026-	Anglia Ruskin University

=== Chief executive ===
No.	Chief executive	Term
1	Libby Hackett	2009–2014
2	Maddalaine Ansell	2015 – 2018
3	Liz Bromley (acting)	2018
4	Vanessa Wilson	2019–present
