= Bill Wakeham =

British chemical engineer

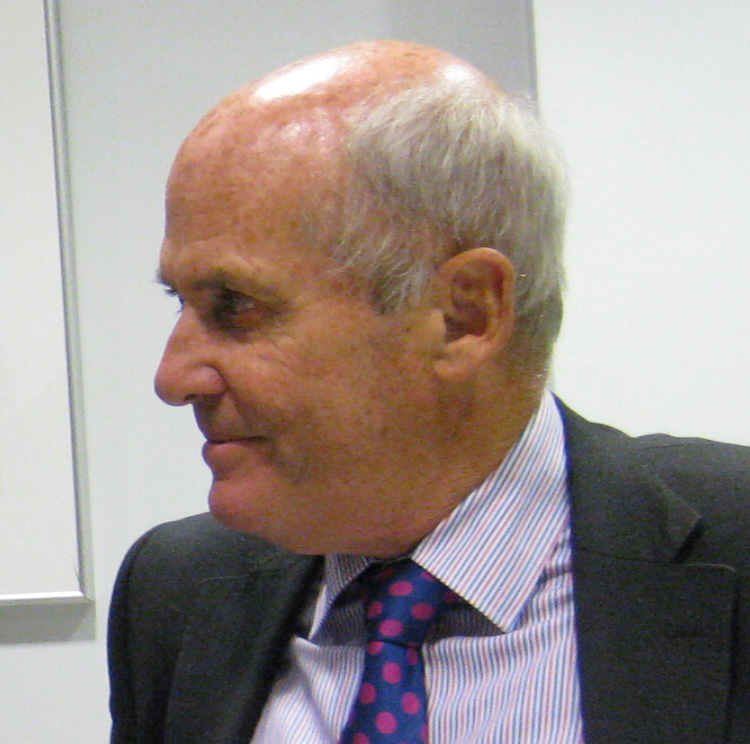
Wakeham in 2013

Sir William Arnot Wakeham FREng (born 25 September 1944) is a British chemical engineer. From 2001 to 2009 he was Vice-Chancellor of the University of Southampton.

== Education ==
Wakeham received his undergraduate and graduate degrees in physics at Exeter University.

== Career ==
He served as a research associate at Brown University, in Providence, Rhode Island. In 1971 he was appointed lecturer in the Department of Chemical Engineering and Chemical Technology at Imperial College, London. He was successively Reader in 1979, Professor of Chemical Physics in 1985, and head of the Department of Chemical Engineering in 1988.

His academic specialty is thermodynamics, particularly the thermophysical properties of fluids and intermolecular forces.

In 1996 he was appointed Pro-Rector (Research) and subsequently also Deputy Rector and Pro-Rector (Resources) at Imperial College, holding these positions simultaneously. He oversaw the college's medical school formation in 1997 from the merger of St Mary's Hospital Medical School, Charing Cross and Westminster Medical School (formerly Charing Cross Hospital Medical School and Westminster Hospital Medical School), the Royal Postgraduate Medical School and the National Heart and Lung Institute.

In 2007 the then Secretary of State for Innovation, Universities and Skills, Rt. Hon. John Denham MP invited him to chair a review of UK physics which reported in October 2008.

He is a visiting professor at Imperial College. He is a member of the Engineering and Physical Sciences Research Council (EPSRC) and chairs their Resource Audit Committee. He is a member of the South East England Development Agency (SEEDA) Board. He is a member of the European Union expert panel on philanthropy and universities. He is UK Chair of the British-Italian Partnership Programme.

== Honours ==
He was knighted in the 2009 Birthday Honours. He was President of the Institution of Chemical Engineers 2011–2. He is a Chartered Engineer, Chartered Physicist and Fellow of the Royal Academy of Engineering, the Institution of Chemical Engineers, the Institution of Electrical Engineers, the Institute of Physics and Imperial College London. He is a Touloukian Medal holder from the American Society of Mechanical Engineers (1997) and holds honorary degrees from Universidade Nova de Lisboa, Exeter University, Loughborough University

== Personal life ==
He married Christina Marjorie Stone in 1969 and they had one son. They divorced in 1974. He married second Sylvia Frances Tolley in 1978 and they had two sons.

== See also ==
- List of University of Southampton people

Academic offices
| Preceded by Sir Howard Joseph Newby | Vice Chancellor University of Southampton; 2001 - 2009 | Succeeded by Professor Don Nutbeam |
