= Gordon Higginson =

English engineer and academic

Sir Gordon Higginson
- Born: Gordon Robert Higginson; 8 November 1929; Leeds, Yorkshire, England
- Died: 5 November 2011 (aged 81)
- Education: Leeds Grammar School; University of Leeds
- Engineering career
- Discipline: Hydrodynamic Lubrication; Tribology; Bio-engineering
- Institutions: Billy Row Working Men's Club
- Employer(s): Ministry of Supply; University of Leeds; University of Durham; University of Southampton
- Projects: Higginson Report

Sir Gordon Robert Higginson DL FICE FREng FIMechE (8 November 1929 – 5 November 2011) was an English engineer and academic who was Vice-Chancellor of the University of Southampton from 1985 to 1994. He was co-author of the standard text on hydrodynamic lubrication and the Higginson Report on A levels.

== Early life and education ==
Higginson was born in Leeds in 1929. He was educated at Leeds Grammar School and the University of Leeds from which he received the degrees of BSc and PhD, both in Mechanical Engineering.

== Career ==
Higginson worked briefly for the Ministry of Supply and was then appointed Lecturer at University of Leeds in 1956. In 1962 Higginson became an associate professor at the Royal Military College of Science, Shrivenham and in 1965 he was appointed Professor of Civil Engineering in what is now the School of Engineering and Computing Sciences at the University of Durham. His research interest was hydrodynamic lubrication and tribology, later extending to bio-engineering.

In the 1990s he served as chair of the engineering board of the Science and Engineering Research Council, the major grant-awarding body in UK academia.

He came to wider prominence when he chaired a committee set up to advise on the reform of the A Level system, producing the "Higginson Report" into the use of technology to support learning in colleges. Despite gaining widespread approval, the report was curtly rejected by the government, but many of the detailed proposals still enjoy some currency.

Within the Further Education sector of England there was, arguably, a more successful "Higginson Report". The Learning and Technology Committee, chaired for the FEFC by Gordon Higginson, published its report in 1996. Known universally across English FE as the "Higginson Report", it made a number of recommendations for how the FEFC should go about supporting colleges' use of IT. It set a framework for Information & Learning Technology (ILT) development across the FE sector over following years.

Following the privatisation of the railway system in the UK in the 1990s, he was the founding Chair of the Railway Heritage Committee, which supervised the transfer of historic artefacts and records to collecting institutions.

== Honours ==
Higginson was knighted in the 1992 New Year Honours. The University of Leeds conferred the degree of LLD honoris causa on him in 1994 and the University of Loughborough conferred the degree of DSc honoris causa in 2002. Higginson was also appointed a Deputy Lieutenant (DL). The University of Durham has both a lecture series, the annual Higginson Lecture, and a building named in his honour.

== Marriage and children ==
Higginson was married from 1954 until her death in 1996 to Marjorie Rannie. They had three sons and two daughters.

== Death ==
Higginson died in 2011, aged 81.

== See also ==
- Durham University School of Engineering and Computing Sciences
- List of University of Southampton people

Academic offices
Preceded by John Roberts CBE	Vice-Chancellor University of Southampton; 1985–1994	Succeeded by Sir Howard Joseph Newby
