= Cheney Student Village =

Residence hall at Oxford Brookes University in England

Coordinates: 51.7532°N 1.2302°W

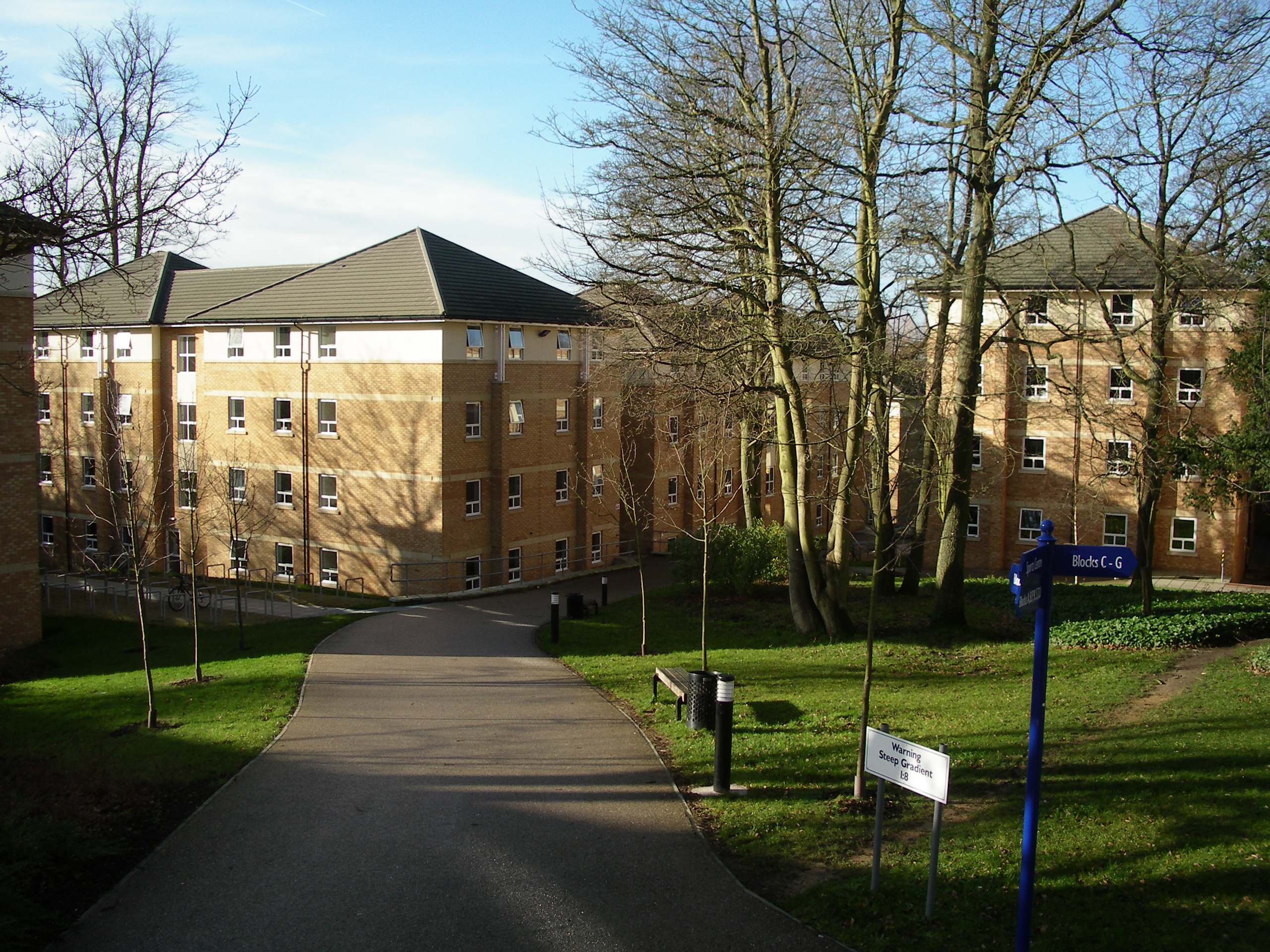
Cheney Student Village

Cheney Student Village is one of the nine halls of residence at Oxford Brookes University in Oxford, England. Located on Cheney Lane in Headington, a few minutes walk away from the Gipsy Lane campus, it houses 750 students in single study bedrooms with en suite shower rooms and self catered kitchens.

== History ==
Originally named Cheney Hall and knocked down in 2002 to 2003, Phase One of Cheney Student Village opened in September 2003 for 350 students (Blocks A to H). Phase Two opened one year later in September 2004 although a number of rooms were not completed until late October 2004. This meant a large group of student having to stay in Keble College and St Catherine's College, Oxford, for a month before transferring to Cheney.

Cheney Student Village was built as part of a partnership between Oxford Brookes University and Jarvis UPP (formerly part of Jarvis PLC). This private finance initiative (PFI) meant that the Hall was financed, built and run by Jarvis UPP on behalf of the University on a 30-year contract.

University Partnership Program (UPP Projects Ltd) took over operation of the business from Jarvis PLC in September 2005, and its sub-company UPP RSL Ltd now operate the running of the Hall.

In the summer of 2006 the common room was completed and opened ready for the start of the 2006/07 academic year.

== Facilities ==
Cheney Student Village is situated in landscaped grounds and has two onsite launderettes, and a sports centre with a floodlit all-weather football pitch nearby. Newly built and all en suite, the residence is made up of 750 single study bedrooms arranged in flats of five or six with shared kitchen/living/dining rooms.
