= Graham Upton =

Graham Upton DL (born 30 April 1944) was chair of the board of Experience Oxfordshire from 2013 to 2017 having previously been chair of the board of Oxford Playhouse for 8 years.

Born in Birmingham, he moved to, and was educated in, Australia, where he taught in secondary and special schools before moving back to the UK in 1972. He worked in the University of Wales and Leeds Polytechnic before moving to the University of Birmingham where he was pro-vice-chancellor and professor of special educational needs and educational psychology.

In September 1997, he accepted the post of vice-chancellor at Oxford Brookes University, which he held until August 2007.

From 21 May 2010 until July 2011, Upton was the interim vice-chancellor of the University of Cumbria. Upton also served as interim vice-chancellor of Glyndŵr University from January 2015 until the appointment of Professor Maria Hinfelaar in April 2016.

In June 2013, he was appointed High Sheriff of Oxfordshire, having been Undersheriff the year before. and served as a Deputy Lieutenant of the County of Oxfordshire from 2014 to 2019. He is married to Bebe Speed, an ex-director of West Midlands Institute of Psychotherapy. They have four children and five grandchildren.

In January 2018, Graham Upton served as Interim Vice Chancellor of Birmingham City University and then in 2019 as the Interim Vice-Chancellor of Bangor University and in 2020 as Interim Director of SOAS London.

In addition to these appointments Professor Upton was Chair of the Board of Oxford Playhouse for 8 years and served on the Board of Governors of the University of the West of England for 8 years.

== Arms ==
Coat of arms of Graham Upton
Crest Upon a Helm with a Wreath Or and Azure A Kangaroo sejant erect Or gorged with two Barrulets wavy Azure and holding in the dexter forepaw a Quill Gules. Escutcheon Or four ragged Staves conjoined in saltire throughout Azure between four Pigs passant Gules. Motto Dilyna Dy Lwybr I Ryddid Badge A Mullet of eight points Or charged with a Pig passant Gules.
