= School of Law, Oxford Brookes University =

UK academic institution

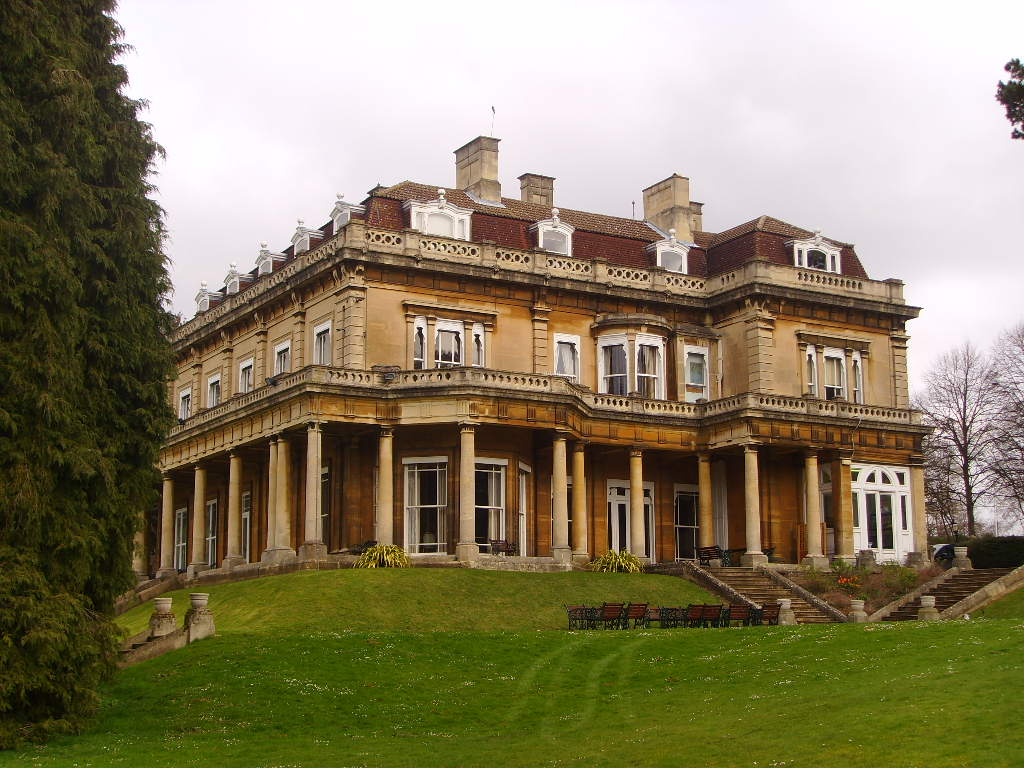
- Type: School of Law
- Established: 1970
- Parent institution: Oxford Brookes University
- Head of School: Professor Dan Bulley
- Academic staff: 23
- Location: Oxford, England
- Campus: Headington Hill
- Website: www.brookes.ac.uk/school-of-law/

The Oxford School of Law is the law school at Oxford Brookes University in Oxford, England.

Oxford Brookes University's School of Law was joint third placed University Law School in England and Wales (joint sixth placed out of all 115 Universities/ FE Colleges in the United Kingdom that offer Law degrees) in the 2016 National Student Survey, with 97% student satisfaction rates. Law courses provided by Oxford Brookes were ranked in the top 150-200 bracket of the QS World University Subject Rankings. The Law School was also 16th placed Law School in the 2016 Guardian Good University guide, gaining legal media coverage for outranking several 'Russell Group' Law schools. The Law School was also in the top 30 of institutions for the study of undergraduate law in the 2015 Times/ Sunday Times Good University Guide, with Law courses placed at 28th out of 100 UK university law schools - again higher than several Russell Group law schools. Moreover, The University has been successful historically in various national and international mooting competitions, in 2015 winning both the ESU Essex Court National Competition and the Inner Temple Inter-Varsity Mooting Competition, the national Magna Carta moot—to celebrate the 800th anniversary of the signing of Magna Carta—was between two Oxford Brookes teams.

== Oxford Brookes Law Society ==
The school has a student-run society called The Oxford Brookes Law Society that organises a variety of events such as the Annual Christmas Ball, visits to the Old Bailey and the Royal Courts of Justice, trips to the European Parliament and the European Court of Human Rights, along with talks from leading lawyers and others.

The Law Society has over 500 active members from various subjects of study and seeks to ensure that all students who are interested in a career in law, strive to do their best and develop whilst at Oxford Brookes University.

== Notable people ==
=== Notable alumni ===
- Jonathan Djanogly – Lawyer, Conservative Member of Parliament, former Shadow Attorney-General, and Under-Secretary of State, Ministry of Justice, 2010–12

=== Notable academics ===
- David Yardley, Head of the Department of Law, Politics and Economics at Oxford Polytechnic (1978–1980)
- Prof Mark O'Brien, Head of the School of Law (2014-2020)
- Prof Lucy Vickers, Head of the School of Law (2020-2022)
- Prof Peter Edge, Head of the Department of Law (2002-2004)

== See also ==
- Oxford Institute of Legal Practice
- Oxford Brookes University
