= Oxford Brookes Centre for Nutrition and Health =

UK nutrition research organization

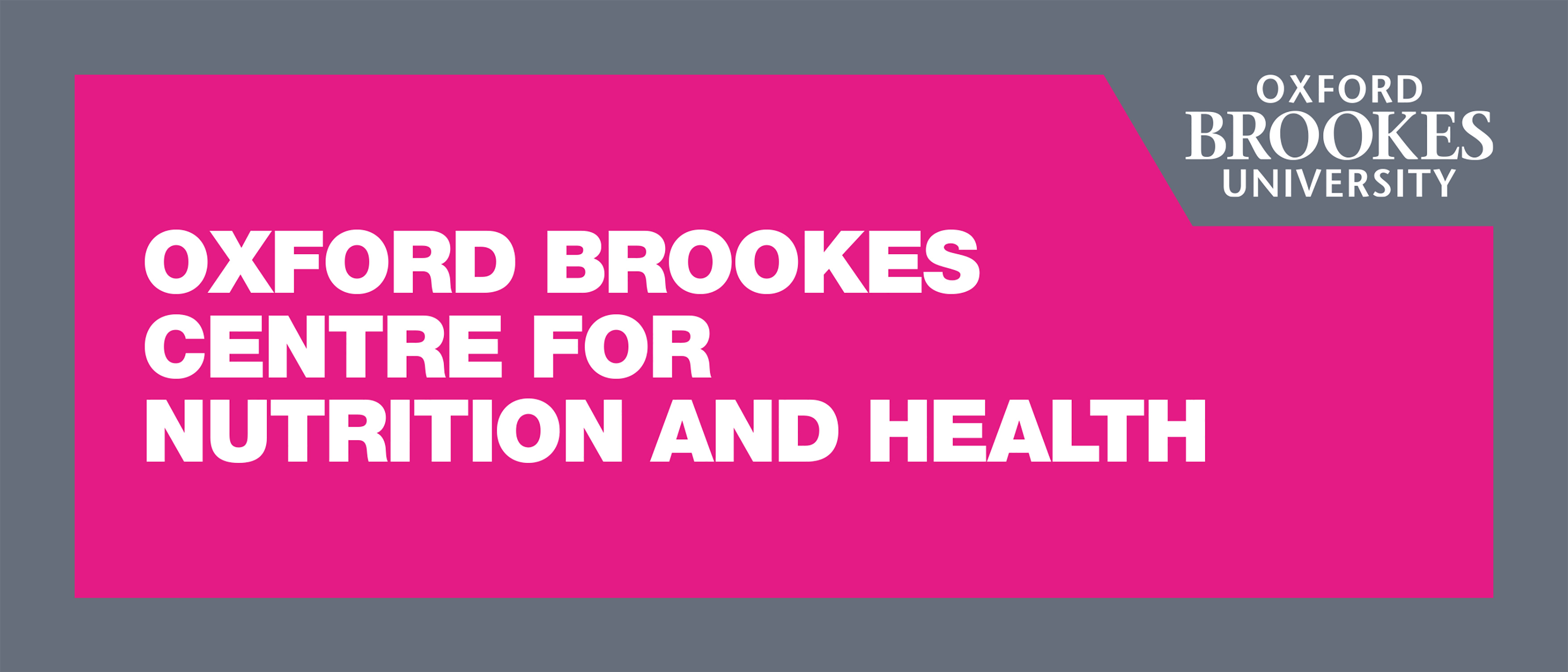
- Predecessor: Nutrition and Food Research Group
- Established: 2009; 17 years ago
- Founder: Jeya Henry
- Type: Research centre
- Location: Oxford, England
- Director: Jonathan Tammam
- Manager: Isabel Butler
- Parent organization: Oxford Brookes University
- Website: www.brookes.ac.uk/research/units/hls/centres/oxbcnh

The Oxford Brookes Centre for Nutrition and Health is the first research centre in the United Kingdom dedicated to researching functional foods.

== History ==
The Oxford Brookes Centre for Nutrition and Health opened as the Functional Food Centre at Oxford Brookes University in early 2009 with a £300,000 grant from the Higher Education Funding Council for England. It was formerly known as the Nutrition and Food Research Group, which had been in existence since 1984. Its founding director, Jeya Henry, is a consultant to the World Health Organization, UNICEF and the Food and Agriculture Organisation of the United Nations on nutrition assessment, food safety and nutrient requirements. The centre offers research and consultancy services to the food industry, the United Nations and various Government agencies.

== Areas of research ==
The Oxford Brookes Centre for Nutrition and Health has the goal of providing scientific information about food and health to consumers, government and the food industry. It tests popular claims about food, for example that genetically modified crops will feed the world, that substances such as omega-3 in fish oil will make children more intelligent, or that antioxidants can reduce cancer by removing free radicals. It develops new food products such as low glycemic index bread, which reduces cholesterol and blood sugar levels and help weight loss. It researches lesser-known foods such as breadfruit, cassava, sorghum and millet. The health issues that are its research priorities are diabetes, obesity and the impact of food on age-related problems.

== See also ==
- British Dietetic Association
- British Nutrition Foundation
- Food Standards Agency
- Royal Society of Medicine
