= Oxford Brookes Students' Union =

Coordinates: 51.75523°N 1.2295°W

Brookes Union
- Institution: Oxford Brookes University
- Location: John Henry Brookes Building, Gipsy Lane, Headington Campus, Oxford, OX3 0BP
- Established: 26 November 1921
- President: Goodness Odiaka
- Vice presidents: Poppy McLean-Inglis; Alexandra Ellington; Hong Kiu Carine Fan
- Members: ~18,000 (2011)
- Affiliations: National Union of Students
- Website: www.brookesunion.com

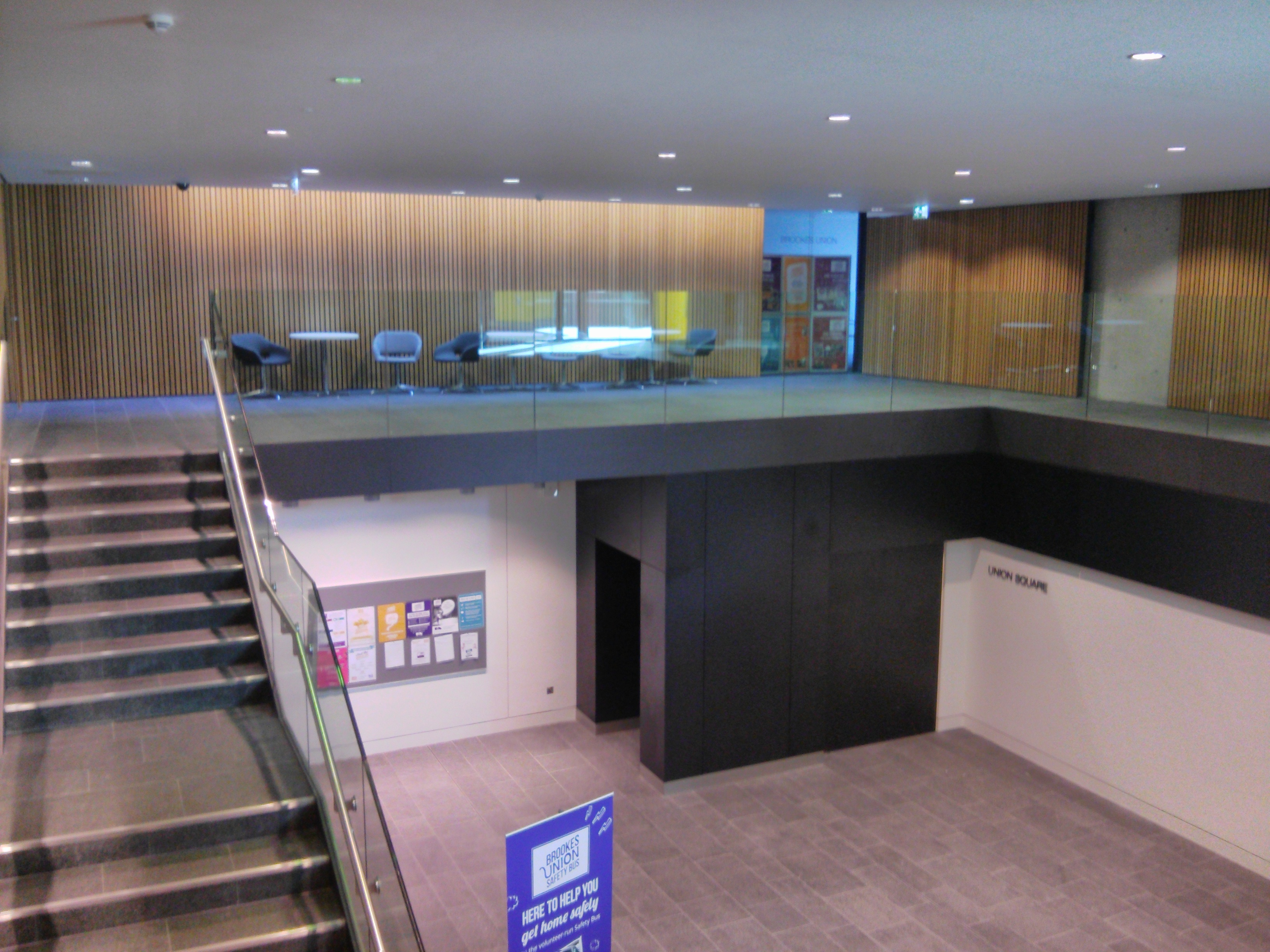
Union Square

Brookes Union (also known officially as Oxford Brookes Students' Union) is a union representing students at Oxford Brookes University. The union offers a range of services for students; it hosts a number of student societies, an advice service and a system of student representation. The union-run Morals bar was open from 1992 until it closed in 2012 when, as part of a university redevelopment, the union moved to Gipsy Lane Campus (and occupied part of the new John Henry Brookes building). In 2012, it scored one of the lowest satisfaction rates in the National Student Survey but has since improved somewhat.

== History ==
The Helena Kennedy Centre where the union was previously located was formerly the headquarters of Pergamon Press, which was the site of Britain's longest running print strike.

=== Oxford Polytechnic Students' Union ===
Throughout the years Oxford Polytechnic Students Union saw students involved in various movements.

The union had an active peace group which regularly participated in the Campaign for Nuclear Disarmament and protests against US military bases on British territory, such as the Upper Heyford air base. In July 1985 the union sent two students from the peace group to Moscow to take part in the 12th World Festival of Youth and Students.

There were some international solidarity campaigns, the anti-apartheid group took students on coaches to London to protest British support for the policy of apartheid in South Africa. This group had a lot of support from Clive Booth who went on to become the vice-chancellor when the college became a university. Some students took part in a civic delegation to Nicaragua during the Contra War and received a delegation of trade unionists from Nicaragua in return. Later on the Students Union passed a motion of solidarity with the people of Nicaragua.

The union also received speakers from Sinn Féin and SWAPO representing national liberation movements in Ireland and Namibia respectively. There were debates around the issue of Israel, with Jonathan Djanogly taking a Zionist position. He was the treasurer of the conservative society at the time.

=== Oxford Brookes Students' Union ===
After 1992, Oxford Polytechnic was converted to a university and the students union changed its name.

In 2012, students protested on the front lawn of the Gipsy Lane campus, calling on the university to prioritise bursaries over fee waivers for student support. They set up camp on 18 April and stayed there until 19 May when they packed up and left overnight. A petition in support of their demands raised 700 signatures.

=== Brookes Union ===
In August 2013, Oxford Brookes Students' Union re-branded to become Brookes Union. The union sported new logos and designs, each colour representing a different aspect of the union whilst retaining overall a design cohesion. At the Annual General Meeting in February 2015, it was motioned (and passed) that the existing format of three Sabbatical Officers would become four with a restructuring of the VP: Student Experience role due to the large remit. As such the VP: Student Experience split into 2 roles, VP: Societies Development and VP: Welfare.

In 2019 the VP officer roles were renamed to: Vice President: Student Voice (formerly Academic Experience), Vice President: Wellbeing (formerly Welfare), Vice President: Activities and Employability (formerly Societies Development)

The part time (portfolio) officer roles were expanded in 2020 to include a Black Students' officer and a BIPOC (Black, Indigenous, People of Colour) Students' Officer.

== National Students Survey rankings ==
All UK universities and Students' Unions are ranked from top to bottom based on overall student satisfaction from graduating student feedback collected in their last year of studying. The National Students' Survey was launched in 2005 with and Question 23 was introduced in 2012 with the intention of gauging student satisfaction of their respective students' union. Question 23 asks "I am satisfied with the Students' Union (Association or Guild) at my institution".

Student Unions are ranked based on the feedback of students and Oxford Brookes Students' Union has ranked as following:

- 2012 – Ranked 134th (out of 134) – 39% Satisfaction (National Average 66%)
- 2013 – Ranked 131st (out of 132) – 37% Satisfaction (National Average 67%)
- 2014 – Ranked 134th (out of 136) – 38% Satisfaction (National Average 68%)
- 2015 – Ranked 131st (out of 137) – 48% Satisfaction (National Average 68%)
- 2016 – Ranked 133rd (out of 137) – 43% Satisfaction (National Average 63%)
- 2017 – 44% Satisfaction
- 2018 – 40.5% Satisfaction
- 2019 – 44.7% Satisfaction
- 2020 – 44.3% Satisfaction
- 2021- 50% Satisfaction

== Governance ==
=== Sabbatical officers ===
- President
- Vice President (Student Voice)
- Vice President (Activities and Employability)
- Vice President (Wellbeing)

=== Portfolio (part-time, unpaid) officers ===
- BIPOC students' officer
- Black Students' officer
- Disabled Students' officer
- Environmental officer
- International Students' officer
- Mature Students' officer
- LGBTQ+ officer
- Women's officer
- Sports officer
- Postgraduate Students' officer
- Trans officer
