= Oxford Brookes University =

Public university in Oxford, England

- Wordmark
- Type: Public
- Established: 1865 (Oxford School of Art); 1891 (Oxford City Technical School); 1956 (Oxford College of Technology); 1965 (Lady Spencer Churchill College); 1970 (Oxford Polytechnic); 1992 (Oxford Brookes University)
- Affiliations: University Alliance; Universities UK; AMBA; ACU
- Endowment: £2.5 million (2015)
- Chancellor: Paterson Joseph
- Vice-Chancellor: Helen Laville
- Academic staff: 1,471
- Administrative staff: 1,410
- Students: 26,095 (2024/25)
- Undergraduates: 21,720 (2024/25)
- Postgraduates: 4,370 (2024/25)
- Location: Oxford, England
- Campus: Urban, suburban
Colours
- Website: brookes.ac.uk

Oxford Brookes University (OBU; formerly known as Oxford Polytechnic) is a public university in Oxford, England. It is a new university, having received university status through the Further and Higher Education Act 1992. The university was named after its first principal, John Henry Brookes, who played a major role in the development of the institution.

Oxford Brookes University is predominantly based at a campus in Headington, Oxford. A second campus is located in Swindon. Two campuses located on the outskirts of Oxford, the Wheatley campus (originally Lady Spencer-Churchill College) and the Harcourt Hill campus, closed in 2024 and 2025 respectively, with all activities moving to Headington.

As of November 2021 the Brookes web site said that the institution had 16,900 students, 2,800 staff and over 190,000 alumni in over 177 countries. The university is divided into two faculties: the Faculty of Arts, Humanities and Social Sciences and the Faculty of Health, Sciences and Technology. Oxford Brookes University's partnership with the Association of Chartered Certified Accountants (ACCA) allows ACCA students to earn a BSc (Hons) in applied accounting with the submission of a research and analysis project work while taking their ACCA examinations. The university also has schools of architecture and law. Brookes is a member of the University Alliance mission.

== History ==
Oxford Brookes University started in 1865 as the Oxford School of Art, located in a single room on the ground floor of the Taylor Institution in St Giles', Oxford. In 1870 the School of Science was added and in 1891, under the administration of the City Council's Technical Instruction Committee, it was renamed the Oxford City Technical School, incorporating the School of Art, which remained distinct. Plans were made to relocate to the former Blue Coat School for Boys on St. Ebbes.

In 1934 the School of Art and the Technical School were merged and John Henry Brookes, head of the School of Art and vice-principal of the Technical School, was appointed the first principal of the merged institution, called the Schools of Technology, Art and Commerce. By 1950 the college had 4,000 students. A new campus was built on a site offered by the local Morrell brewing family. Renamed "Oxford College of Technology", it opened on the new site in 1956. Its first residence hall was established in 1960 and the college relocated to Headington in 1963.

In 1970, it became Oxford Polytechnic. In 1976, it took over the former Lady Spencer-Churchill College, which had been founded in Wheatley in August 1965. In 1992 it incorporated the Dorset House School of Occupational Therapy, the first school of occupational therapy in the UK. Later in 1992, following enactment of the Further and Higher Education Act, it became Oxford Brookes University, the only one of the new universities to be named after its founder. In 2000, it took over the site of Westminster College, Oxford, basing its education and theological activities on the site, although theology was withdrawn in 2015.

In October 2003, Oxford Brookes University became the first university in the world to be awarded Fairtrade status.

Baroness Kennedy served as the university's chancellor from 1994 to 2001. In 2007, Graham Upton retired as vice-chancellor and his successor, Janet Beer, was inaugurated in September. In July 2008, Shami Chakrabarti, director of Liberty, replaced Jon Snow as chancellor.

In March 2015, Alistair Fitt was inaugurated as vice-chancellor, replacing Janet Beer. In May 2022, Brookes Union released a letter stating the student body had filed a no confidence motion against Fitt. Dame Katherine Grainger, a former British Olympic rower, replaced Shami Chakrabarti as chancellor. Grainger was Britain's most decorated female Olympic athlete and the first British woman to win medals at five successive games (Rio 2016, London 2012, Beijing in 2008, Athens in 2004 and Sydney in 2000). She was made a dame for her services to rowing and charity in the 2017 New Years Honours. In June 2020 Katherine Grainger stood down as chancellor, with Paterson Joseph appointed in October 2022.

In 2015, Oxford Brookes University celebrated its 150th anniversary. A range of events and activities took place, including celebrations recognising John Henry Brookes, the university's modern founder. The first founder's day was held in May 2016.

== Campuses ==
Oxford Brookes University's activities are primarily located at the Headington Campus across three sites at Gipsy Lane, Headington Hill and Marston Road. The university operates a second campus in Swindon.

The front of the new John Henry Brookes building

Headington campus

The Headington campus is located in a residential area of East Oxford. The main site on Gipsy Lane is home to a number of departments from across the university's academic faculties, as well as the university library, the main lecture theatre, and the student union, as well as primary administrative services. The site has undergone significant redevelopment, with the £132 million John Henry Brookes Building opening in 2014.

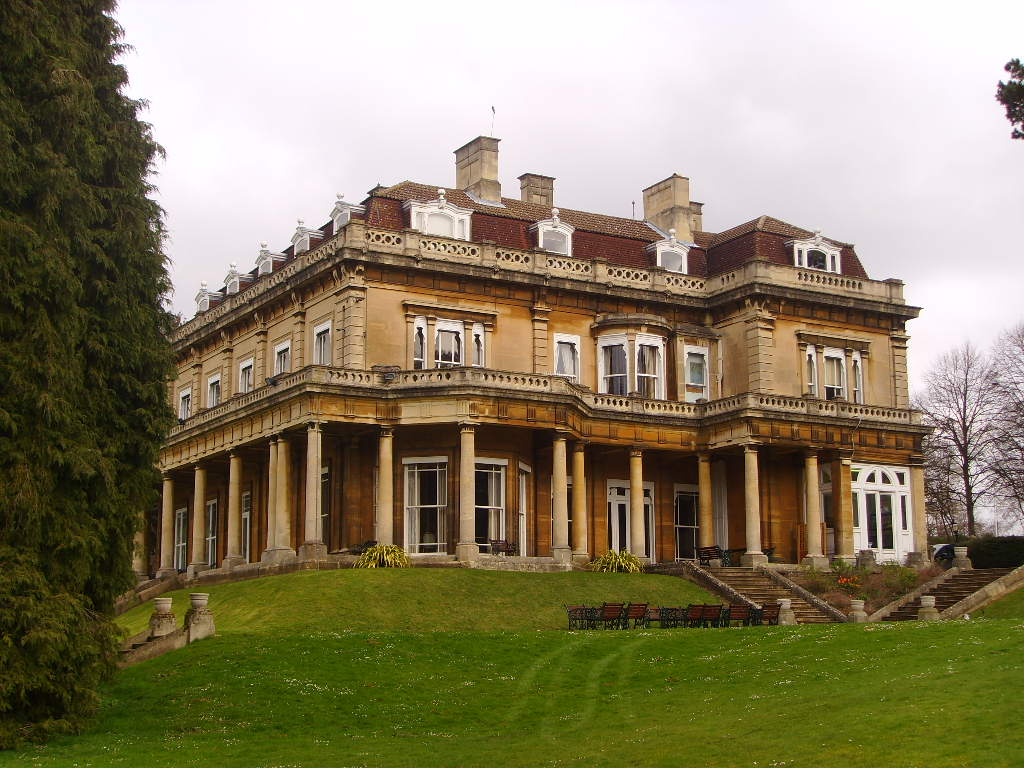
Headington Hill Hall, the home of the School of Law

Across the road is the Headington Hill Hall site, home to the School of Arts and School of Law, as well as brand new facilities in the New Headington Hill Building (NHHB), accommodating engineering and motor sports activities formerly based at the Wheatley Campus.

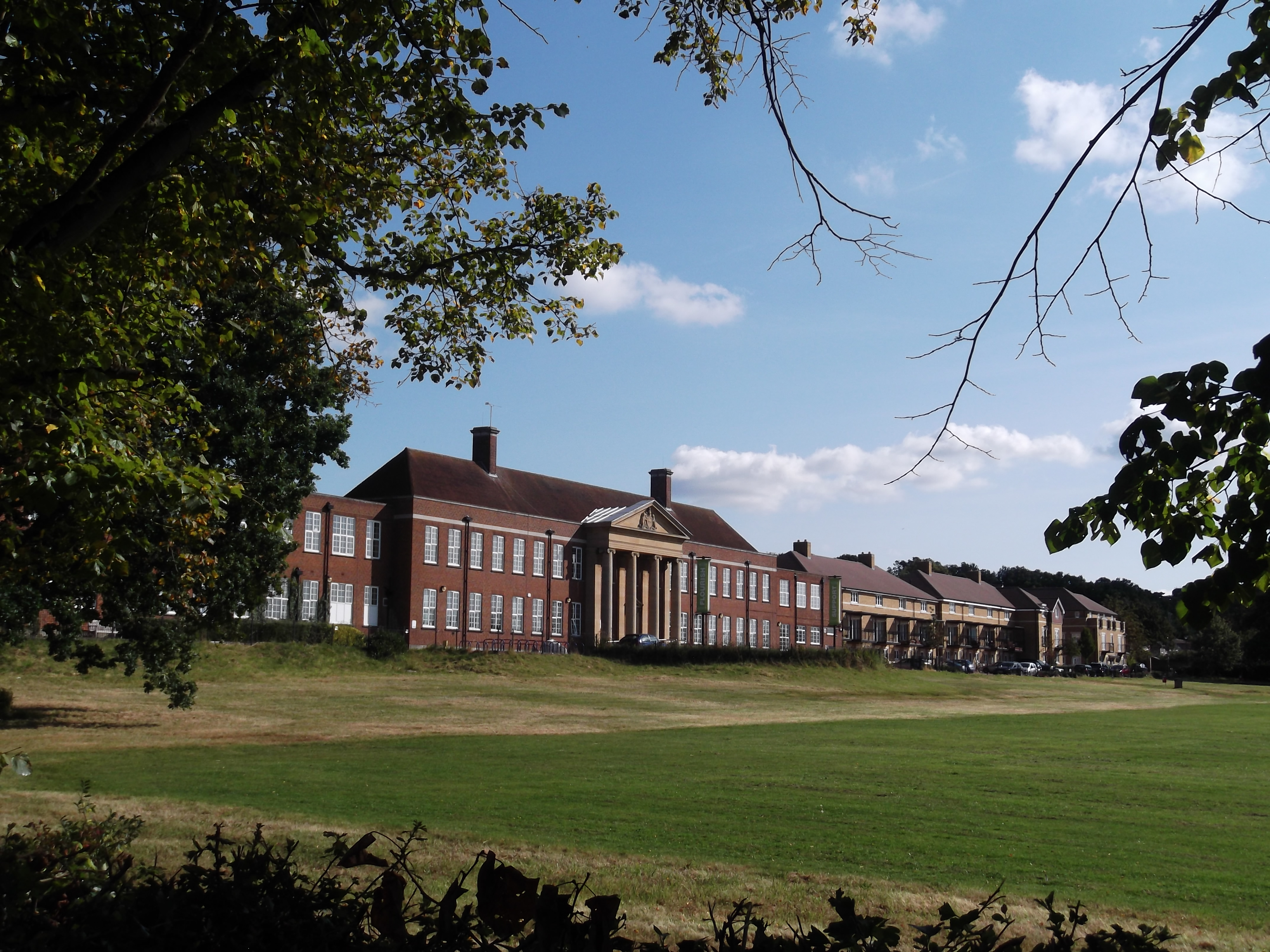
Marston Road site, Faculty of Health and Life Sciences

A short walk from main site is the Marston Road site, providing a dedicated space for subjects including nursing, midwifery and occupational therapy.

Located on the campus are the main halls of residence, including Crescent Hall, Cheney Student Village, Clive Booth Hall, Clive Booth non-en suite (formerly Morrell Hall), Warneford Hall and New Clive Booth Student Village.

Swindon campus

Oxford Brookes University opened its Swindon campus in August 2016. The university moved from the former Ferndale campus in Swindon to a new and larger campus situated to the west of the town centre in the Delta Business Park. The building is named the Joel Joffe Building after Lord Joel Joffe, long-time Swindon resident and former human rights lawyer. Adult nursing, operating department practice (ODP) and a range of continuing professional development (CPD) courses are taught there. The campus features a 185-seat lecture theatre, library and social learning spaces, teaching rooms and three clinical skills suites.

Oxford Brookes University partners with Swindon College as part of its Associate College Partnership to deliver foundation and degree courses, and provides widening participation activity with local schools.

=== Former campuses ===
Wheatley campus

The Wheatley campus was near Wheatley in the Oxfordshire countryside, seven miles (11 km) south-east of the city centre. Information technology, mathematics and engineering were taught there. The tall tower block can be seen from the A40 dual carriageway. The top four floors of the tower were initially closed in the early 2000s following the suicide of a student from the top. Five years later the rest of the tower was shut after asbestos was found and the building was deemed unsafe to house students. Since the end of October 2024, this campus has closed and the university has relocated all activity to newly-built facilities at the Headington Hill site.

Harcourt Hill campus

The Harcourt Hill campus is situated on Harcourt Hill on Oxford's western perimeter, two and a half miles (4 km) from the city centre. Education, philosophy, religion, theology, media and communication, and other subjects were taught here. It has two halls of residence: Harcourt Hill Hall and Westminster Hall. A regular devoted bus service links the campus to other campuses at Headington and Wheatley. It is also home to the university's leisure centre.

The campus was formerly the site of Westminster College, Oxford, an independent Methodist higher education institution which specialised in teacher training and theology. The campus was leased to Brookes by the Methodist Church, and Westminster College became the Westminster Institute of Education of Oxford Brookes University, located at the Harcourt Hill campus.

The university plans to move all teaching and library services away from Harcourt Hill to the Headington Campus for the start of the 2025/26 academic year.

=== Redevelopment ===
In recent years, the university has seen major redevelopments including the opening of the £132 million John Henry Brookes Building, named after the university's spiritual leader, which opened on the Headington campus in 2014. It brings together the library and teaching spaces with student support services and the Students' Union (Brookes Union), who were formerly housed in the Helena Kennedy Centre on the Headington Hill site. The building has won multiple awards including a Royal Institute of British Architects (RIBA) National Award; three RIBA regional awards; Oxford Preservation Trust Award and the Student Experience category of the 2014 Education Estates Awards.

The university's original redevelopment proposals were vigorously opposed by local residents in 2009 when presented to the local planning committee, with many undesirable aspects of the large student population in Oxford being discussed. However, the plans for the new building were eventually approved and building work began in 2010.

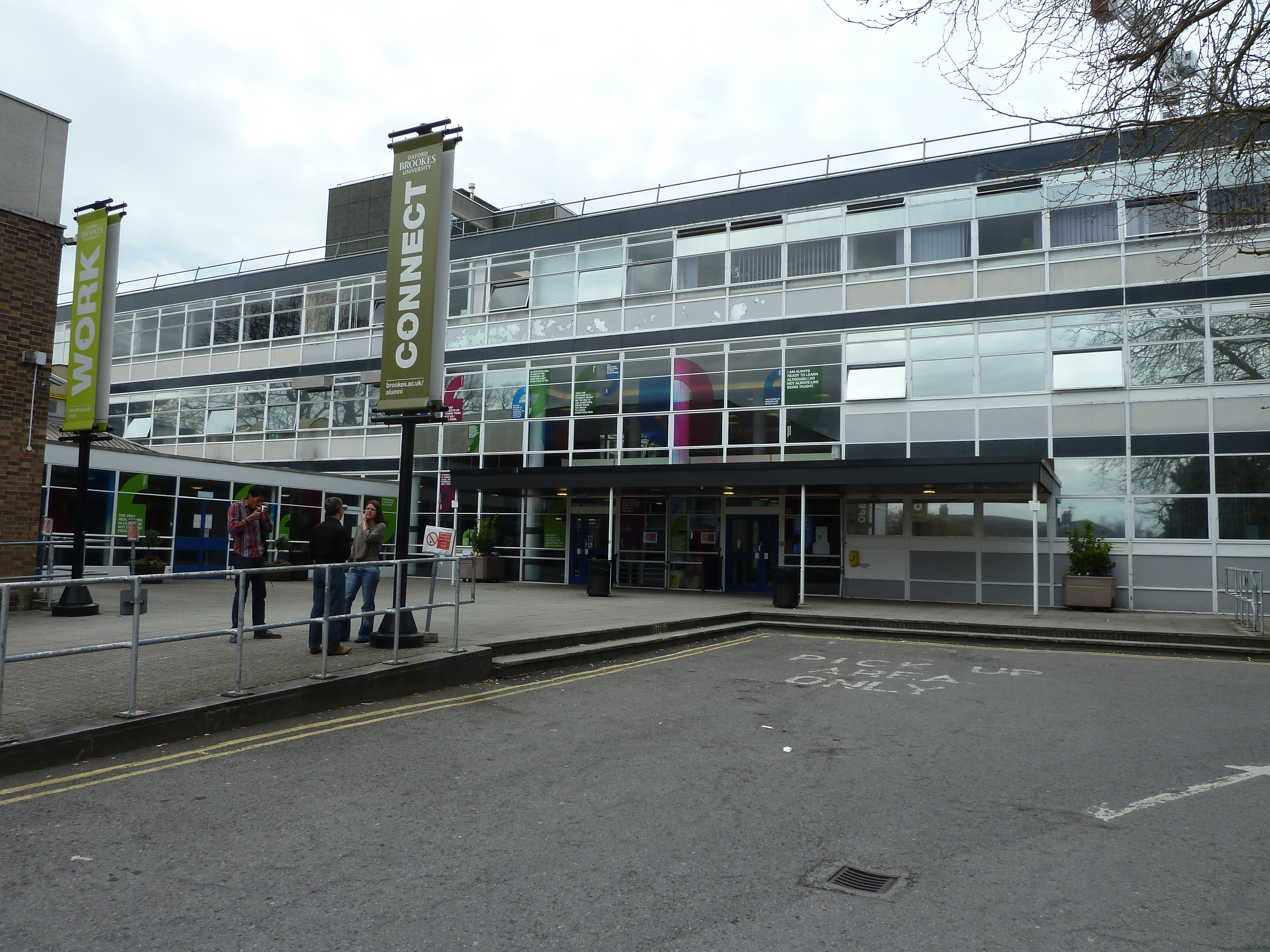
The former main reception in 2013

In 2013, the redeveloped Abercrombie Building opened on the Headington campus, offering facilities for architecture students, with design studios and collaborative learning spaces. In October 2014, it won the Architects' Journal Retrofit Award.

In January 2015, Oxford Brookes University announced a major estates investment for the next 10 years, with £13 million per year to be spent on redevelopment across all its campuses. This is to include additional building on the Headington and Harcourt campuses as well as a new campus in Swindon. Part of this investment will see all activity moved from the Wheatley campus by 2021/22. The Oxford Brookes Business School moved from the Wheatley campus to refurbished buildings at Headington campus in 2017 with plans for other departments to move to new buildings on the Headington Hill site in the future, many of which were postponed due to COVID-19 and issues with budgets.

Wheatley campus ceased operation in 2024 and the New Headington Hill Building (NHHB) opened in January 2025 to accommodate those subjects. Harcourt Hill campus is planned to transfer to Headington Campus for the start of the 2025/26 academic year.

== Organisation and governance ==
=== Faculties and Schools ===
Oxford Brookes University has two faculties, within which are 11 schools, which sit across its three campuses.

Faculty of Arts, Humanities and Social Sciences (AHSS)

The university closed its music department which had been operating since 1977 in 2023.

- School of Arts
- Oxford Brookes Business School
- School of Education, Humanities and Languages
- School of Law and Social Sciences

Faculty of Health, Science and Technology (HST)

- Oxford School of Architecture
- School of Biological and Medical Sciences
- School of the Built Environment
- School of Engineering, Computing and Mathematics
- Oxford School of Nursing and Midwifery
- School of Psychology, Social Work and Public Health
- School of Sport, Nutrition and Allied Health Professionals (including the Functional Food Centre)

=== Chancellors ===
- Baroness Kennedy (1994–2001), barrister, broadcaster, Labour member of the House of Lords
- Jon Snow (2001–2008), journalist
- Shami Chakrabarti (2008–2015), lawyer
- Dame Katherine Grainger (2015–2020), rower
- Paterson Joseph (2022–2026), actor

=== Vice-chancellors ===
- Clive Booth (1992–1997)
- Graham Upton (1997–2007)
- Janet Beer (2007–2015)
- Alistair Fitt (2015–2025)
- Helen Laville (2025–present)

== Academic profile ==
=== Reputation and rankings ===
Rankings
National rankings
- Complete (2027): 45
- Guardian (2027): 80
- Times / Sunday Times (2027): 110=

Global rankings
- QS (2027): 411=
- THE (2026): 801–1000

Oxford Brookes University was ranked among the world's top institutions in 16 subjects and four subject areas in the QS World University Rankings by Subject 2017. In 2016, Brookes was listed as one of the world's top universities for its international outlook in the Times Higher Education's (THE) Top 200 international universities. Brookes has retained its top ten world ranking in the QS Distance Online MBA Ranking 2017 for its MBA programme. The university has 10 National Teaching Fellowships from the Higher Education Authority and was among the top 25 in the UK for teaching quality in the Times/Sunday Times Good University Guide 2016. Brookes is ranked in the top 51–100 for Architecture and Business & Management Studies in the world by QS World University Rankings by Subject 2019. It is also ranked in the top 10 for Hospitality & Leisure Management in the world by QS World University Rankings by Subject 2019. In both 2018 and 2019, QS World University Rankings named it the only UK university on its list of Top 50 universities under 50 years old in the world. It is among the top 400 universities in the world, ranked 363rd by the QS World University Rankings 2020.

In 2011, Oxford Brookes University was the sixth largest employer in Oxfordshire.

Hotcourses UK ranked Oxford Brookes University in the top 15 of the most culturally diverse institutions in the UK in July 2016.

In July 2016, Headington and Harcourt Hill campuses received a Green Flag Award for the quality of their green spaces for the fifth year in a row.

In 2016, Oxford Brookes University achieved an overall satisfaction rate of 87% in the National Student Survey (NSS) higher than the national average of 86%. The university also had 18 subject areas which received 90% or higher overall satisfaction.

==== Separate schools ====
- Oxford Brookes University's School of Architecture is one of the largest in Britain and is consistently ranked in the top five schools in the UK and in the top 50 in the world.
- Brookes' School of Law is the 16th-placed law school in the latest Guardian Good University Guide. The law school is also ranked 28th out of 100 UK university law schools for the study of undergraduate law in The Times and Sunday Times Good University Guide 2020. Moreover, law courses also are ranked in the top 150-200 bracket of the QS World University Subject Rankings. The university has been successful in national and international mooting competitions, in 2016 winning both the ESU Essex Court National Competition and the Inner Temple Inter-Varsity Mooting Competition, meaning the national Magna Carta moot – to celebrate the 800th anniversary of the signing of Magna Carta – as a consequence will be between two Oxford Brookes University teams.

=== Research standing ===
In the Research Excellence Framework in 2014 (REF 2014) 94% of research was internationally recognised and 59% judged to be of "world leading" quality or "internationally excellent". This led to a 41% increase in quality-related research funding compared to a 3% rise across the sector.

In October 2016, the university retained its HR Excellence in Research Award from the European Commission, recognising the university's commitment to supporting the personal, professional and career development of its research-active staff.

=== Specialist study ===
The Centre for Development and Emergency Practice (CENDEP) in the School of the Built Environment was awarded the Queen's Anniversary Prize. CENDEP provides an academic setting for the study of cities, humanitarianism and refugees. Singer and activist Annie Lennox is patron of the Master's Course in Humanitarian and Development Practice.

In 2008, the MSc in Primate Conservation was also awarded the Queen's Anniversary Prize.

The Oxford Brookes Centre for Nutrition and Health is the UK's first research centre dedicated to functional foods. The centre was originally the Nutrition and Food Research Group at Oxford Brookes and was founded in 2004.

Computer science

The Department of Computing and Communication Technologies is internationally recognised for its research especially in the area of robotics, web technology, networking and software engineering. The department has a strong international student population in both its undergraduate and postgraduate programmes.

Automotive and motorsport engineering

The Oxford Brookes School of Technology is known for its automotive and motorsports technology/engineering courses leading to undergraduate BSc (Hons), BEng (Hons), MEng (Hons) and MSc degrees. Due to the close links between the school and several Formula One teams around Oxfordshire, the syllabus development for the undergraduate and postgraduate courses are carried out in collaboration with Formula One teams. Over the decade, the school has developed a niche for producing Formula One design and race engineers, who go on to build championship winning cars, participating in the FIA Formula One Championships. The school is also home and lead institution to Motorsport Knowledge Exchange which is a Government-funded small cooperative of institutions, involved in delivering motorsport education at a variety of levels from technician to postgraduate.

In 2007, Formula One world champion Fernando Alonso sponsored 12 Spanish postgraduate students to study for an MSc in motorsport engineering or in race engine design within the Department of Mechanical Engineering and Mathematical Sciences at the university. The university has a teaching staff that includes Geoff Goddard, a former chief designer at Cosworth.

The School of Technology at Oxford Brookes University is one of the three core universities in Faraday Advance, a partnership in advanced materials for transportation that develops future materials and technology for low-pollution, high-efficiency, cost-effective transport.

=== Partnerships ===
Oxford Brookes University's partnership with the Association of Chartered Certified Accountants (ACCA) allows ACCA students to earn a BSc (Hons) in Applied Accounting with the submission of a research and analysis project work while taking their ACCA examinations.

The university has a partnership with the International Business School (Nemzetközi Üzleti Főiskola) based in Budapest (Hungary). IBS students can attend courses which, besides the Hungarian degree, also provide OBU BA degrees in different subjects, such as marketing and communications.

The university has affiliations with Nilai University College in Malaysia. Affiliated subjects are computing, accounting and finance, business management, marketing management and hospitality management. All the subjects mentioned above are 3+0 programs.

=== Consultancy ===
The Environmental Information Exchange (EiE) is a professional not-for-profit environmental consultancy. EiE was created in 1998 by Dr Anne Miller and Patsy Wood, both based at the university, aiming to help organisations with limited resources to reduce the environmental impacts of their activities.

== Student life ==
=== Student union ===
Oxford Brookes Students' Union is the students' union of the university. It is a member-led organisation and all students are automatically members. The union offers a range of services for students; it hosts a number of student societies, a safety bus service, an advice service, and a system of student representatives. In 2012, Oxford Brookes students' union was ranked among the worst in the country for student satisfaction, according to the National Student Survey (NSS), where only 34% of students claimed to be content with the students' union.

=== Accommodation ===
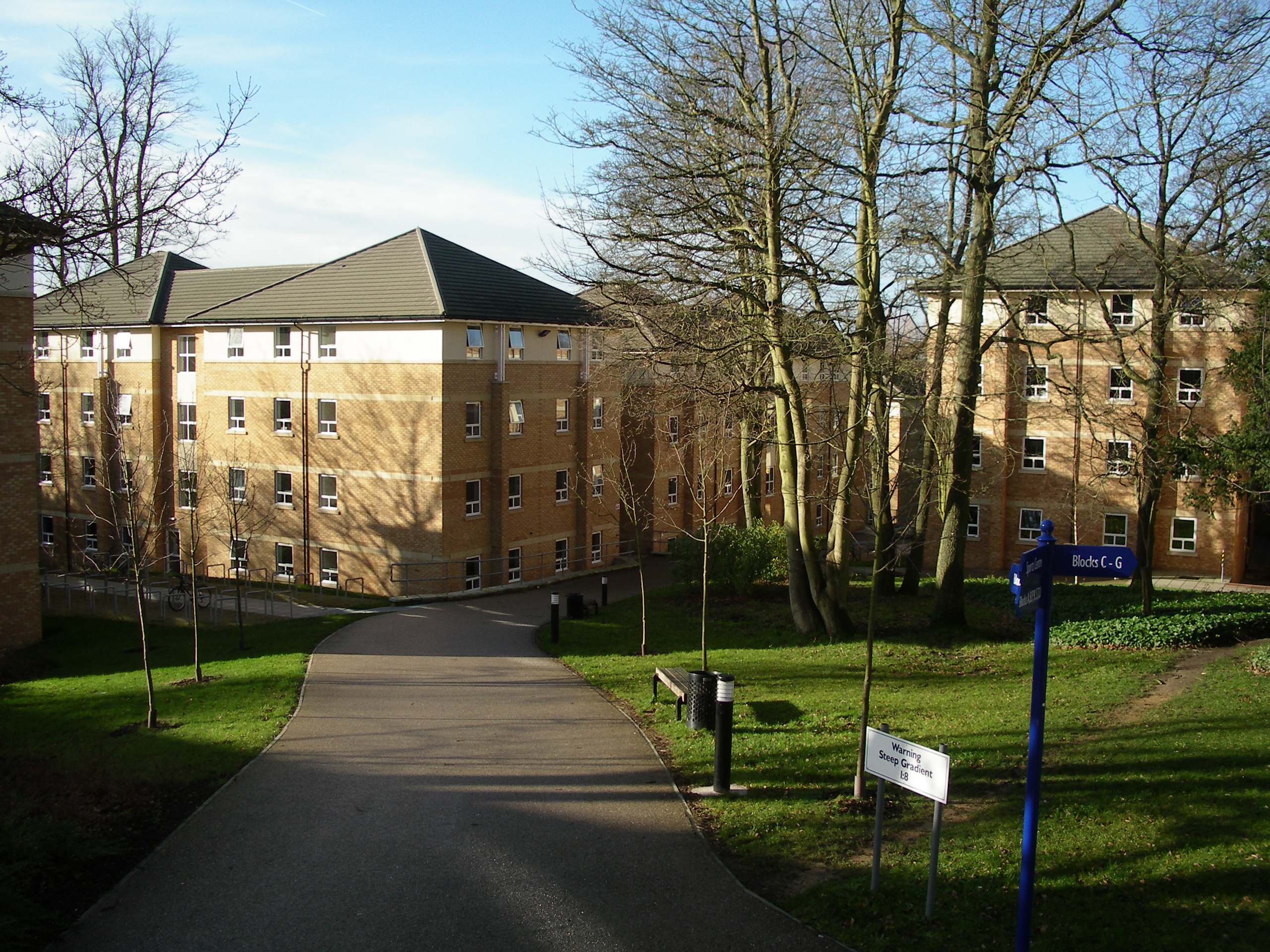
Cheney Student Village

There are currently 13 student halls, five of which are on Headington campus, two on the Harcourt Hill campus, one on the Wheatley campus and three more halls around Headington. In addition, there are five privately operated halls of residence which are managed in partnership with the university by housing associations: Slade Park Student Apartments, Parade Green, Sinnet Court Student Apartments, Beech House Student Accommodation and Dorset House Student Apartments.

- Cheney Student Village
- Clive Booth Student Village
- New Clive Booth Student Village
- Crescent Hall
- Westminster Hall
- Lady Spencer Churchill Hall
- Paul Kent Hall
- Slade Park
- Dorset House
- Beech House
- Parade Green
- Sinnet Court

=== Transport ===
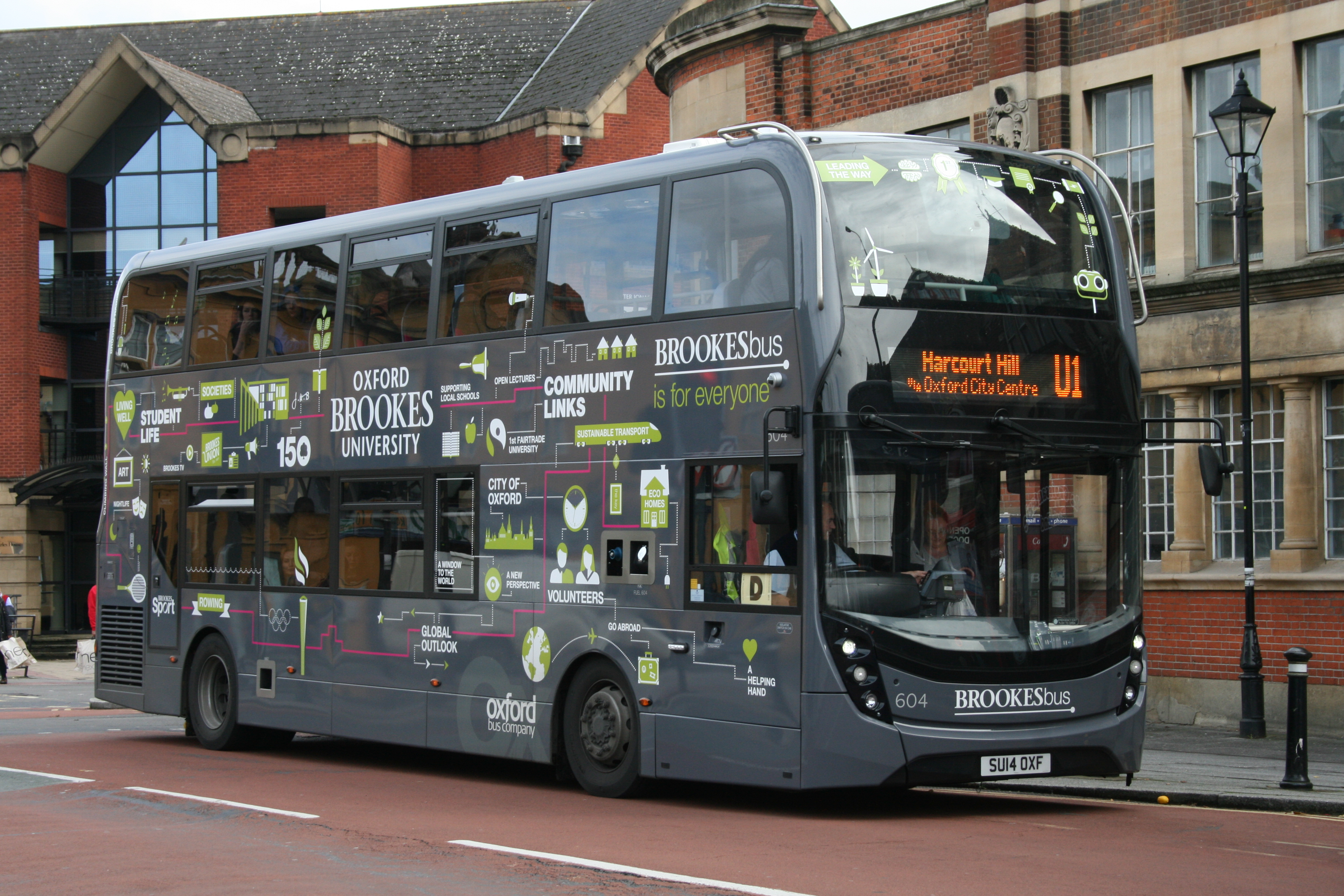
Oxford Bus Company flywheel energy storage bus on a BrookesBus service

BrookesBus was a public bus service operated under contract by the Oxford Bus Company which operated between all Brookes campuses and student halls in Oxford. University students and staff were able to obtain a BrookesKey, which offered discounted travel on Oxford Bus Company local services. This also included an Inclusive Travel Pass for full-time students, offering free travel on BrookesBus operated services.

In 2025, it was announced that the university had decided not to renew its BrookesBus contract with the Oxford Bus Company, with no new BrookesKey or Inclusive Travel Passes issued beginning the 2025/26 academic year. Instead, a subsidised annual CityZone bus pass is now available to students and staff of the university, with passes subsided further for students living more than 2 miles from Headington Campus. Bursary holders are also eligible for further subsidies.

This announcement was met with controversy from students and staff, with a petition calling for the reversal of this decision gaining over 1,000 signatures. Concerns were raised that students, already financially stretched by the cost of living crisis, would find it impossible to fund a £220 bus pass, with further concerns for the safety of those travelling back late from society events deciding to walk back to their accommodation rather than catch the bus.

== See also ==
- Armorial of British universities
- List of universities in the United Kingdom
- Post-1992 universities
