= John Henry Brookes =

British scholar

John Henry Brookes OBE
- Born: 31 January 1891; Northampton, England
- Died: 29 September 1975 (aged 84); Oxford, England
- Education: Oxford City School of Arts and Crafts
- Occupations: Artist, craftsman, illustrator, author, educator, administrator and academic principal
- Known for: Founding Oxford Brookes University, artist, writer and scholar

John Henry Brookes OBE (31 January 1891 – 29 September 1975) was an English craftsman, artist and educator associated with the predecessor institutions of Oxford Brookes University, which is named in his honour.

== Biography ==
Brookes was born in Northampton, England. His father was Oxford town cryer and his mother worked as a seamstress and hatmaker.

Brookes trained in silversmithing at the Chipping Campden Guild of Handicrafts. He was an accomplished artist but became both an inspirational teacher and accomplished administrator. In 1922, he was appointed as a part-time teacher of sculpture in the Oxford City School of Arts and Crafts.

In 1934, the technical and art schools were merged as the Schools of Technology Art and Commerce, with Brookes as its first principal. There were ten full-time staff and 1,284 students. By 1946, the schools were in 19 sites around the city and Brookes had of necessity become an accomplished cyclist.

With the spread of the schools around the town there was a great desire to move them all onto one site. The Morrells brewing family offered 33 acres at the top of Headington Hill and plans were drawn up, but the City Council turned them down. There was a great public protest and a citizens meeting was held in a packed Town Hall. Eventually the plans were approved. The foundation stone was laid by Lord Nuffield.

Brookes encouraged printing as a discipline in the college and also had many of his own drawings published. For many years his pen and ink drawings were a regular feature of the Oxford Times.

He was very much involved in the Oxford community and was on many committees especially those concerned with young people. He was a magistrate for many years and when he retired from the college he became one of the directors of the Oxford Playhouse.

Brookes died in Oxford in 1975, aged 84.
