= UoN Racing Team =

University of Nottingham's electric racing teams

University of Nottingham Racing Team
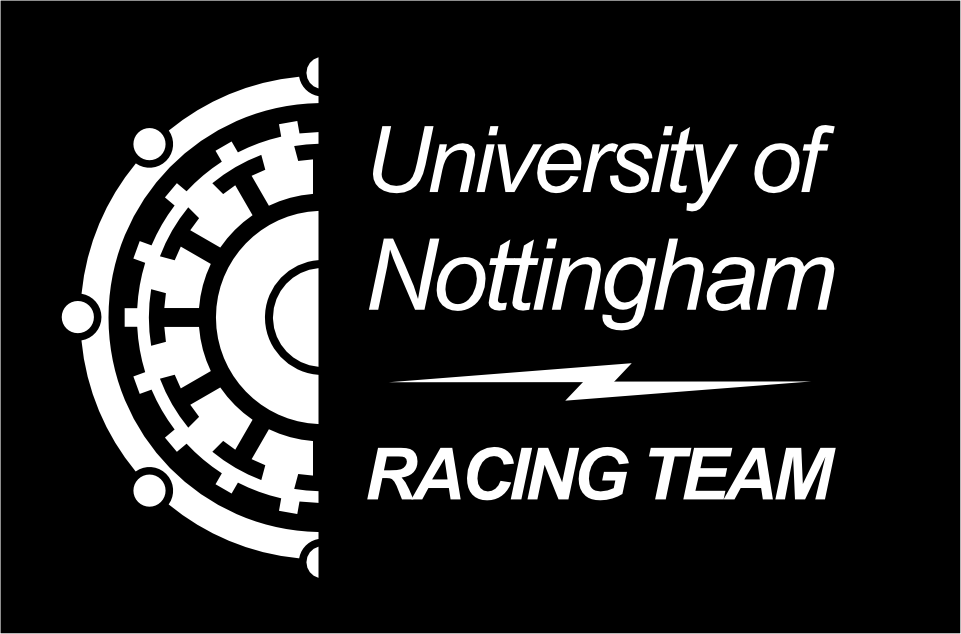
- Abbreviation: UoNRT
- Formation: 2016
- Headquarters: UoN Faculty of Engineering
- Website: https://www.nottingham.ac.uk/engineering/studentexperience/uon-racing-team/uon-racing-team.aspx

University of Nottingham Racing Team (UoNRT) is the University of Nottingham's student-run electric vehicle team. The team comprises two sub teams, namely Formula Student and Solar Challenge. The University of Nottingham also used to compete in the e-bike area, with its Power Electronics Machines and Control Research Group (PEMC) from the Faculty of Engineering. Working on new technologies they were awarded "best" EV at Formula Student UK 2021. The teams are currently developing a "Lighter, more efficient Formula Student car" and a 2-seater Solar Challenge car "designed around upcycled EV systems". The team relies on external sponsors to fund the development, manufacture and testing of the vehicle.

Together, the two sub teams are made up of approximately 400 undergraduates, postgraduates, and faculty staff.

== Formula Student ==
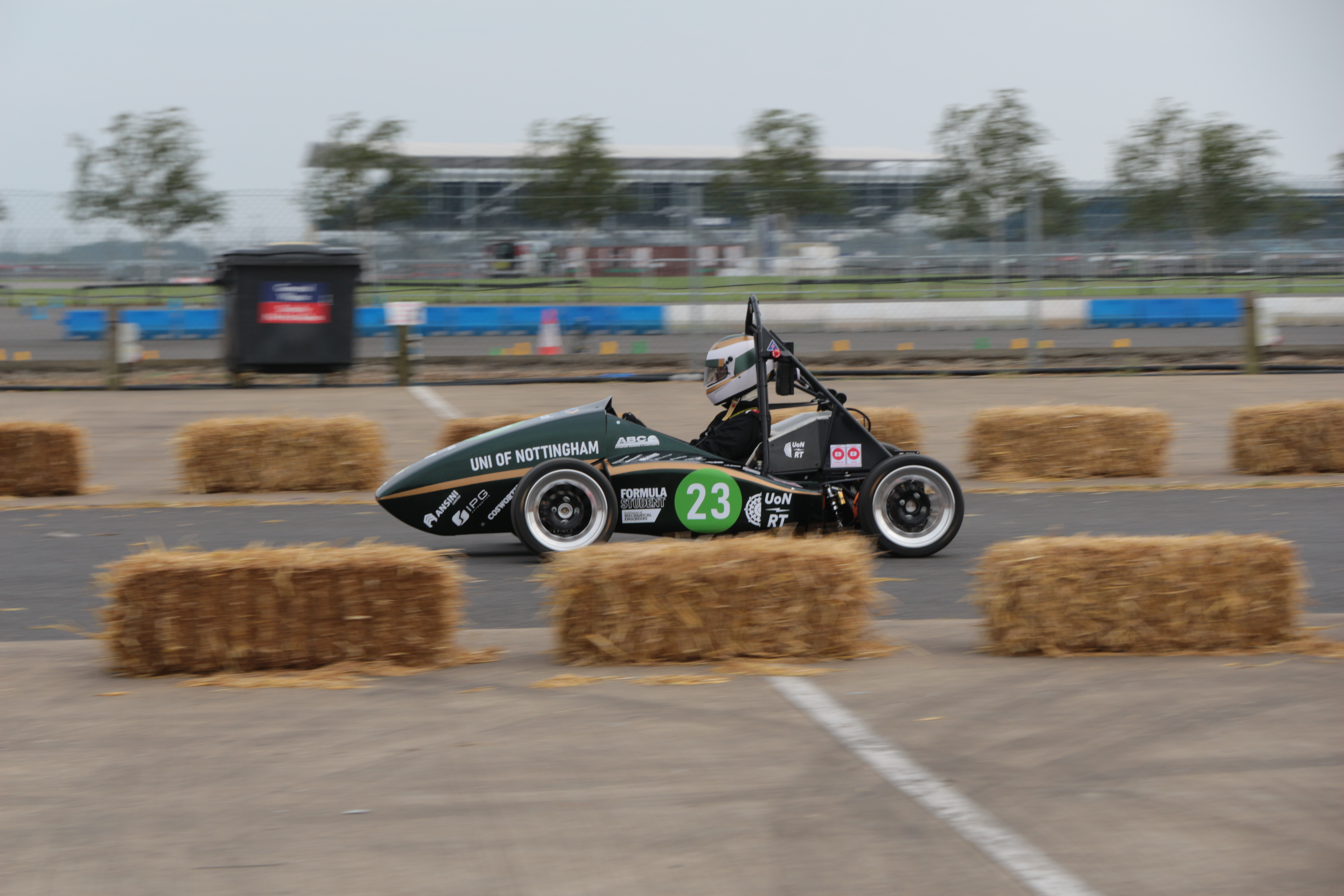
UoN Racing Team's car, Frankie (FS2021), at the FS UK 2021 competition

UoNRT re-launched its Formula Student project in 2016, following a break of five years. The team designs a single-seat electric racing car to compete in the IMechE Formula Student UK competition against other teams with both electric and conventional combustion engine vehicles.

The team aimed to design and manufacture the UK’s first all-wheel drive electric car. The first entries in 2017, 2018 and 2019 did not participate in the competition’s dynamic events; the team placed 63rd, 61st and 59th respectively in these years. In 2020, UoNRT switched to a two-wheel drive powertrain and placed 19th out of 66 teams at the virtual static competition.

UoNRT returned to Silverstone in 2021 with a new 2WD car and achieved their best results to date. The car placed third overall, and won "Best EV of 2021" On top of this, the UoNRT Business Team came first in their competition, beating 108 other universities.

The 2021 car, named Frankie, will be used as a testing platform in 2021-22 as the team works on future projects including a new, lightweight drive unit and upgrading to a carbon fiber chassis and suspension.

=== FS2021 ===
==== Specifications ====
Name	Frankie
Number of Wheels	4 (2WD)
Maximum Motor Power	45 kW
Motor Torque	32 Nm
Gearbox	9:1
Torque Per Rear Wheel	288 Nm
Maximum Speed	60 mph
Battery Storage Capacity	6.5 kWh
Battery Voltage	405v at full charge
Battery Technology	Li-Ion (pouch cell)
Chassis Construction	Steel tube spaceframe
Bodyshell Construction	Vacuum formed ABS
Weight	296 kg

=== Competitions ===
Year	Race	Car	Car Number	Entrants	Final Position	Achievements
2017		FS2017			63rd	
2018		FS2018			61st	
2019		FS2019			59th	
2020		FS2020		66	19th	
2021	Silverstone	FS2021	23	35	3rd	Business Team came first in their competition, beating 108 other universities.

== Solar Challenge ==
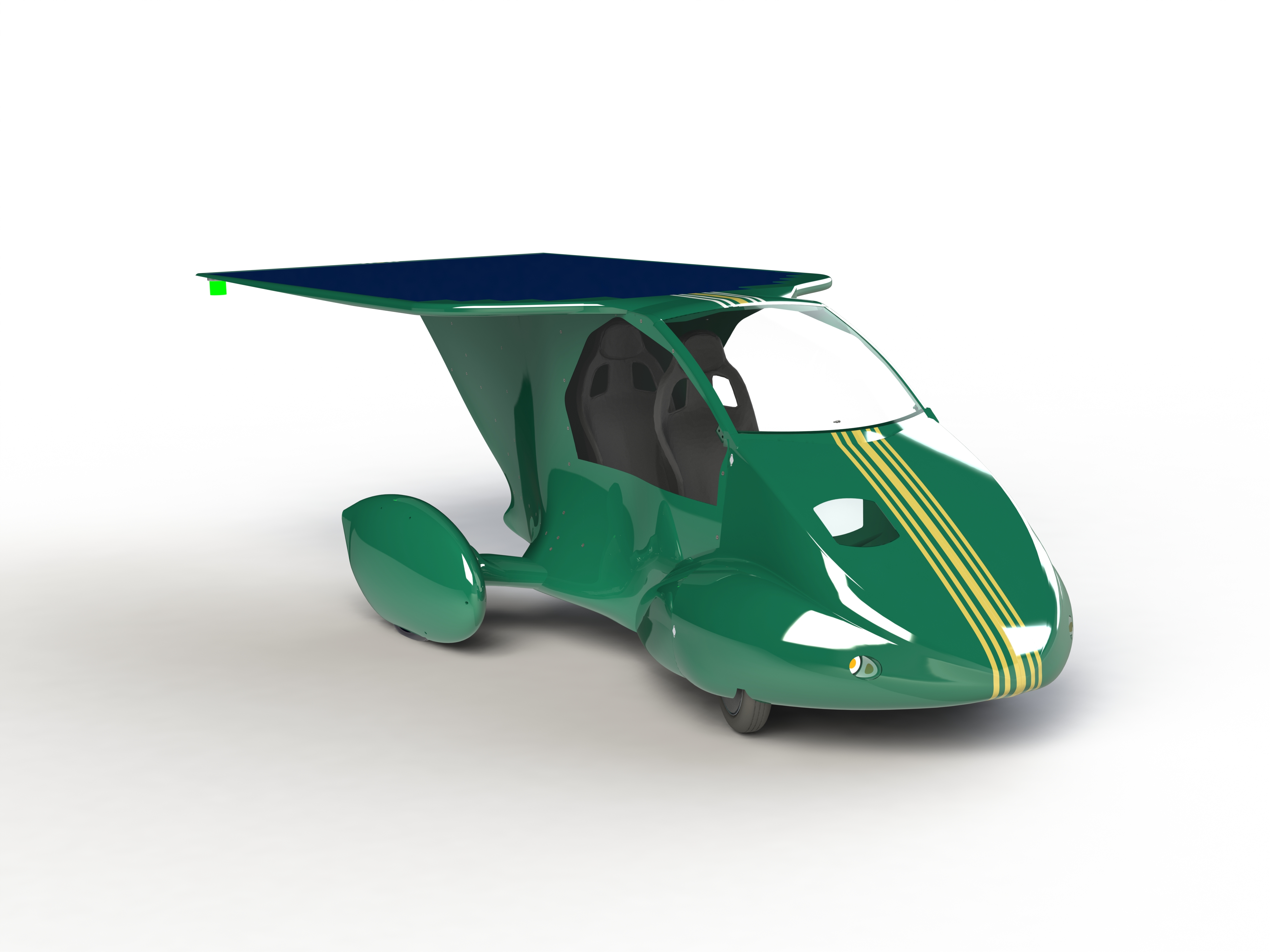
UoN Racing Team's Solar Challenge Vehicle SC2021

UoNRT started a new project in 2020-21 to build a solar-powered electric car to participate in Solar Challenge competitions around the world. The guiding principles of solar challenge vehicles are to be ultra-efficient, designed for endurance, and push the boundaries of sustainable electric vehicle technology.

This is the first time the University of Nottingham has set up a solar car project. The team are developing a Cruiser class car, and they are taking an approach focused on low-impact design and manufacture. Alongside featuring 5m2 of solar panels, UoNRT’s first solar car will be adapting and upcycling parts from used electric vehicles. The chassis is modified from a Renault Twizy base, and second-life Nissan Leaf batteries are installed. They aim to be an environmentally-friendly alternative to the growing problem of dealing with end-of-life batteries from electric vehicles.

The team aim to complete the first car in 2022, in time to participate in the European Solar Challenge and prepare for the World Solar Challenge in 2023. The team have said they will target further events around the world as the team develops.

=== SC2021 ===
==== Specifications ====
Name	TBC
Number of Wheels	4 (front steered and rear driven)
Solar Array Power	1 kW average on a sunny day
Solar Cell Efficiency	22-24%
Solar Array Size	5m^{2}
Maximum Motor Power	10 kW
Maximum Speed	70 mph
Battery Storage Capacity	36 kWh
Battery Voltage	135 V (at full charge)
Battery Technology	Li-Ion Pouch cells (Second life Nissan Leaf batteries)
Chassis Construction	Steel tube spaceframe (modified Renault Twizy chassis)
Bodyshell Construction	CFRP and vacuum formed ABS

=== Competitions ===
Year	Race	Car	Car Number	Entrants	Final Position	Achievements
2022	European Solar Challenge	SC2022	TBC	TBC	TBC	TBC
2023	World Solar Challenge	SC2023	TBC	TBC	TBC	TBC
