= Royal College of Podiatry =

Professional association for chiropodists and podiatrists in the UK

RCPOD
- Royal College of Podiatry
- Founded: 1945; 81 years ago
- Headquarters: Quartz House, 207 Providence Sq, Mill Street, London, England, United Kingdom
- Location: United Kingdom
- Members: ▼8,736 (2023)
- General Secretary: Jane Pritchard
- Chair: Michelle Scott
- Affiliations: TUC; GFTU; PARN
- Website: rcpod.org.uk
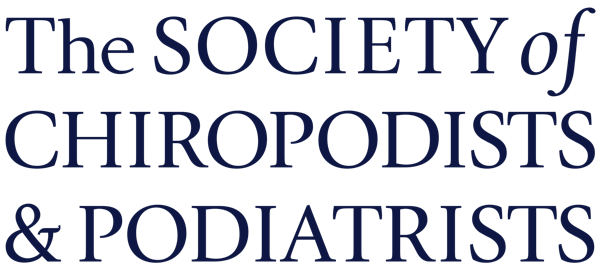

The Royal College of Podiatry (RCPod) is the professional association and trade union for registered chiropodists and podiatrists in the United Kingdom.

Previously known as Society of Chiropodists and Podiatrists (SCP) it changed its name in 2018 to the College of Podiatry and in 2021 became the Royal College of Podiatry. The charitable subsidiary of the organisation is the College of Podiatry which was formed in 2012.

The union originated in 1912 as the Society of Chiropodists, the first organisation of chiropodists in Europe. In 1916, it was renamed the Incorporated Society of Chiropodists, and in 1919, it established examinations for potential new members. Several rival organisations emerged: the Northern Association of Chiropodists, the Chelsea Chiropodists Association and the British Association of Chiropodists. These merged with the Incorporated Society in 1945, the new body once more taking the name Society of Chiropodists. It was recognised as a negotiating body by the National Health Service in 1948, but did not register as a trade union until 1978. In 1993, it became the Society of Chiropodists and Podiatrists, recognising the membership of podiatrists, and in 1997, it affiliated to the Trades Union Congress. In 1998, the Association of Chief Chiropody Officers and the Podiatry Association both merged with the society.

In 2021 The College of Podiatry was renamed as the Royal College of Podiatry (RCPod) after being granted permission to use the title by Queen Elizabeth II.

== Royal Patronage ==
Queen Camilla became the society's Patron in 2005. Queen Elizabeth The Queen Mother was previously patron, from 1993 until her death in 2002.

== Trade union activities ==
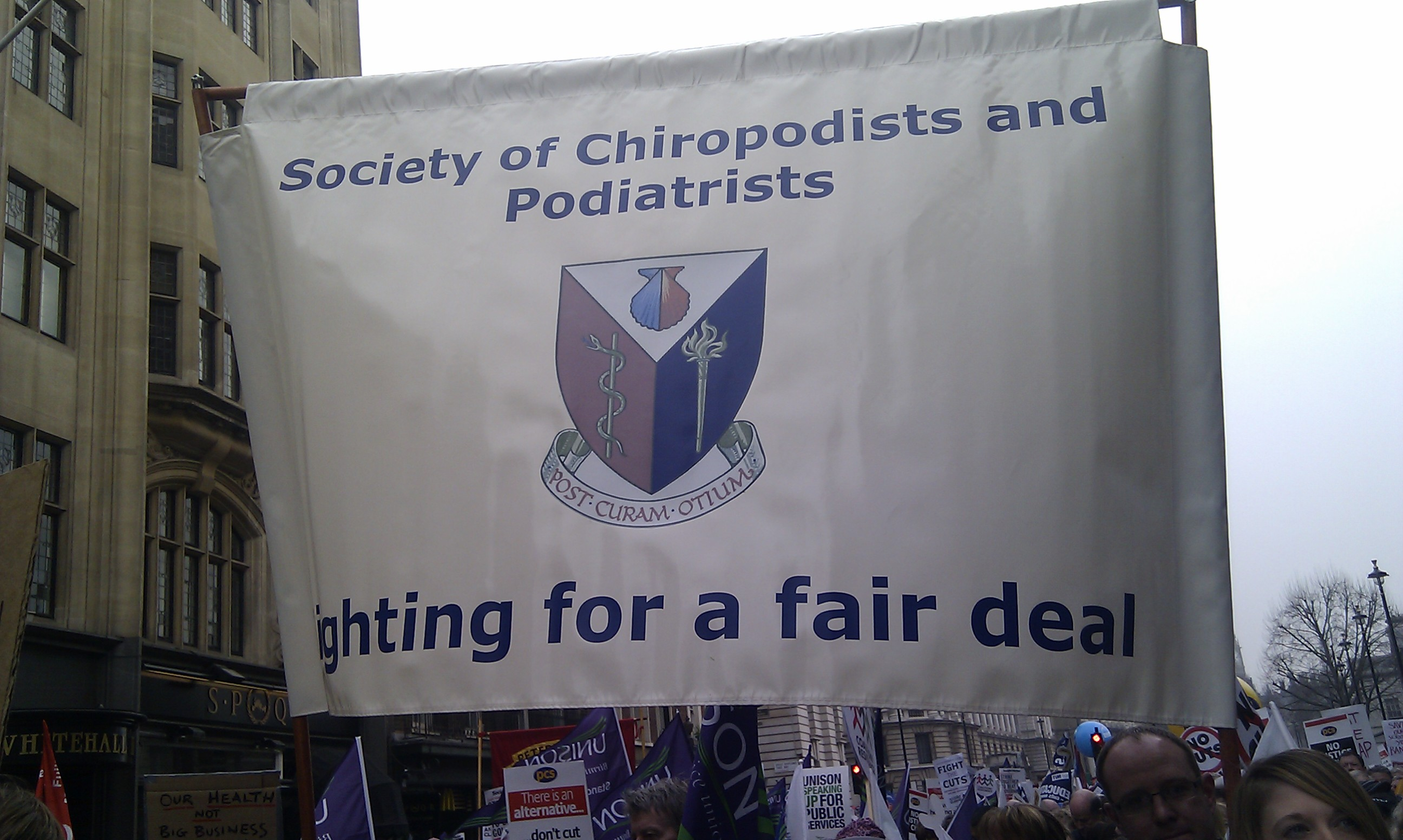
Society of Chiropodists and Podiatrists banner 2011

The trade union arm of the Royal College is delivered by a network of local representatives and regionally based Employment Relations Officers.

The Royal College is a member of the TUC, the STUC, the WTUC and the Congress of Irish Trade Unions.
