= Railway Heritage Committee =

The Railway Heritage Committee (RHC) was set up in the 1990s following the Privatisation of British Rail in the United Kingdom in the 1990s. Its purpose was to identify and designate railway records and artefacts which were historically significant for the British railway system and which were worthy of permanent preservation and being kept securely.

The RHC was an executive non-departmental public body of the Department for Transport. The committee was abolished in 2013 but its powers were transferred to a new Railway Heritage Designation Advisory Board reporting to the board of trustees of the Science Museum, London from 1 April 2013.

Sir Gordon Robert Higginson, a former Vice Chancellor of the University of Southampton was the founding chair of the committee.

== See also ==
- National Railway Museum - section on policies
- History of rail transport in the United Kingdom
- List of British railway museums
- List of British heritage and private railways
- Heritage railways in Northern Ireland
- List of heritage railways
- Mountain railway
- List of Conservation topics
- Conservation in the United Kingdom
- List of railway companies
- British Rail
