= Janet Beer =

British academic

Dame Janet Beer DBE

Vice-Chancellor of University of Liverpool
- In office February 2015 – December 2022
- Preceded by: Sir Howard Newby
- Succeeded by: Tim Jones

President of Universities UK
- In office 2017–2019
- Preceded by: Julia Goodfellow
- Succeeded by: Julia Buckingham

Personal details
- Born: 1 August 1956 (age 70)
- Education: University of Reading; University of Warwick
- Profession: Professor of English and American Literature

Professor Dame Janet Patricia Beer, DBE is a British academic who served as the Vice Chancellor of the University of Liverpool from February 2015 until December 2022. She took over from Howard Newby, having previously been Vice-Chancellor at Oxford Brookes University and Pro-Vice Chancellor Academic and Dean of Humanities, Law and Social Sciences at Manchester Metropolitan University.

== Education and career ==
Dame Janet is a graduate of the University of Reading and Warwick University and held a fellowship at Yale University. She worked for the Inner London Education Authority between 1983 and 1989 and fulfilled academic and leadership roles at Warwick, Roehampton and Manchester Metropolitan.

Dame Janet came to the end of her term of office as Chair of the University Alliance in 2012; from 2000 until 2007 she was a Specialist Adviser to the House of Commons Education & Skills Select Committee; she has served a full term as a Board Member at the HEA and was founding Chair of the PVC Network; she was an Editorial Board member on 'The Journal of American Studies from 1997 to 2011, Associate Editor of 'The Year's Work in English Studies' from 1999 to 2007 and a Director of Carcanet Press from 1999 to 2006; she was a member of the Peer Review Panel for English at the AHRC from 2000 to 2005 and was a Council member of the AHRC and Chair of their Assurance Board from 2018 until 2025; she has also fulfilled a variety of different Board and Chairing roles for the QAA, Leadership Foundation, British Association for American Studies, the Fulbright Commission and the Council of University Deans of Arts and Humanities. She was: a Trustee of UCAS from 2012 until 2017 and chaired their Audit Committee, a Trustee of the British Council from 2014 until 2020, and a member of the Advisory Board of the Higher Education Policy Institute from 2007 until 2017. From 2011 until 2015 she was an elected Visiting Fellow of Nuffield College, Oxford.

Dame Janet completed her term of office as chair of the steering group for the National Student Survey (HEPISG) in 2016. She previously chaired the Equality Challenge Unit and served as Vice President of Universities UK, England and Northern Ireland. She then up took office as President of Universities UK in August 2017, serving until July 2019.

Dame Janet is a member of the Advisory Board for the Government Skills and Curriculum Unit, Patron of the Mark Evison Foundation, Chair of the Sport and Recreation Alliance, an Independent Governor of Northumbria University, a Director of the Board of the Baltic Centre for Contemporary Arts, a Trustee of the Royal Anniversary Trust, a Member of the Education Honours Committee, and a Trustee of the Imperial War Museum.

== Research and publications ==
Dame Janet has a record of research in late nineteenth- and early twentieth-century American literature and culture and contemporary Canadian women's writing. She has written a number of books about Edith Wharton, most recently, in 2011, 'Sex, Satire and the Older Woman' (co-authored with Avril Horner). She has published on early twentieth-century American literary figures, transatlantic relationships and cultures.

== Selected works ==
- Beer, Janet (2005). "The Pro-Vice-Chancellors' Network" (PDF). Academy Exchange. 1: 13.

Academic offices
Preceded by Julia Goodfellow	President of Universities UK; 2017-19	Succeeded by Julia Buckingham
