= Cambridge University Eco Racing =

Solar car racing team

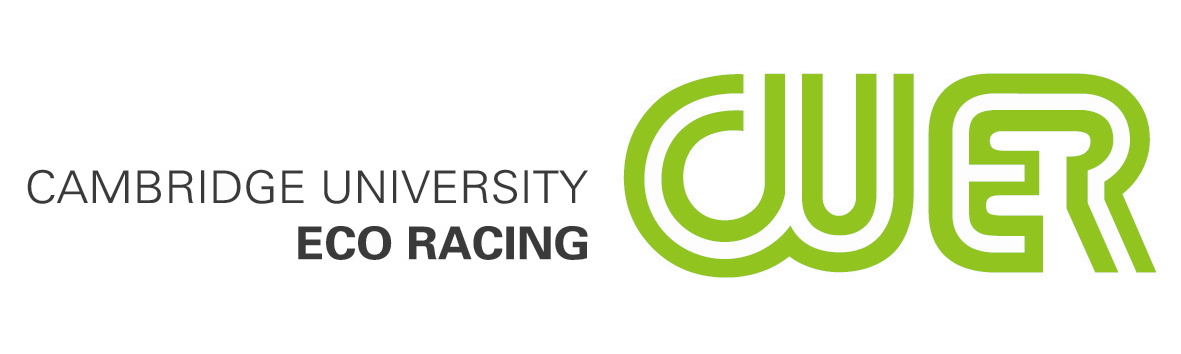
Cambridge University Eco-Racing logo

Cambridge University Eco Racing (CUER) is one of UK's solar car racing teams. A team of 60 Cambridge students designs, builds and races solar-powered vehicles. Founded in 2007, their first prototype vehicle, Affinity, became the first solar-powered car to drive legally on UK roads. CUER competes in the biennial World Solar Challenge. Their race vehicle for the 2013 race, Resolution, is known for its innovative tracking plate design and unusual teardrop shape. Evolution, builds upon this previous design and was entered into the 2015 race, where it became the best UK entry since 2007. In 2017, CUER built Mirage, which crashed before the race had begun due to "a sudden loss of dynamic stability". CUER switched from Challenger Class to Cruiser Class in 2019, however, early electrical issues prevented the team from progressing beyond the first stage of the race.

== Background ==
Cambridge University Eco Racing is based in the university's Department of Engineering and consists of around 60 undergraduate members from several departments of Cambridge University. As well as having a large student body, the team is strongly supported by a number of academic and industrial advisers, including Hermann Hauser and David Cleevely.

The team was founded in 2007 by Martin McBrien, inspired by the solar car team at MIT. Their first vehicle, Affinity, was designed and constructed in early 2008 and was used as a prototype and display vehicle rather than for serious competition. In June 2008, Affinity was driven from Land's End to John O'Groats to raise awareness of sustainable energy. As part of the End to End venture, it was endorsed by the Driver and Vehicle Licensing Agency to legally drive on UK roads, and became the first such vehicle to qualify. CUER runs outreach events at local schools and has been featured in a wide range of local, national and international media.

In July 2008, work began on the second generation CUER vehicle, Endeavour. Following design work by a number of students in the Engineering Department, and with the support of the advisory board, the team competed in the 2009 World Solar Challenge, a 3000 km marathon across Australia. They came 14th, of 26 competitors, after a battery failure severely hindered their chances of competing effectively. Endeavour's 2009 entry was launched by Jenson Button at the Goodwood Festival of Speed.

Over the next two years, they continued redesigning and refining Endeavour, resulting in a car with much improved aerodynamic properties and more reliable batteries. The team used CFD simulations to make minor tweaks to the canopy, and tested the car extensively at a local airfield, before heading out to the next World Solar Challenge in October 2011. There, after the hardest race on record due to a combination of thunderstorms and bush fires, they came 25th out of 37 teams.

CUER's newest vehicle and Resolution's successor, Evolution, was its entry into WSC 2015. It implements improvements that addresses many of the stability and structural problems that affected Revolution, while maintaining the new design. The race was used as a proof-of-concept for Evolution's design and to identify areas for improvement in future race cycles. As well as this, Evolution achieved 2,047 km on solar power to become the most successful UK entry into WSC since 2007 in terms of distance covered under solar power. The team finished 22nd of 27 Challenger class competitors.

== Vehicles ==
=== Affinity ===
Affinity was CUER's first vehicle, built as a prototype and based on a shape taken from MIT's Manta Elite solar car. Affinity became the UK's first road legal solar car, successfully driving from Land's End to John o'Groats as part of CUER's "End to End" tour in 2008.

| Dimensions (LWH) | 5 × 2 × 1 m |
| Cruising speed | 30 mph |
| Top speed | 50 mph |
| Kerb weight | 250 kg |
| Chassis | Steel space frame |
| Solar array power | 1 kW |
| Motor Efficiency | 80% |
| C_{d}A | 0.19 |

=== Endeavour ===
The second generation vehicle, designed and built to compete in the World Solar Challenge. First entering the World Solar Challenge in 2009, the team led by Anthony Law raced across the Outback of Australia marking the team's highest placed finish to date. Endeavour was modified and take to Australia again in 2011 by the team led by Emil Hewage.

| Dimensions (LWH) | 5 x 1.8 × 1 m |
| Cruising speed | 45 mph |
| Top speed | 70 mph |
| Kerb weight | 230 kg |
| Chassis | Aluminium space frame |
| Solar array power | 1.2 kW |
| Motor efficiency | 90%+ |
| C_{d}A | 0.14 |

=== Resolution ===
Designed and built in under 12 months, Resolution's innovative aerodynamic shape breaks away from the classic 'table top' design seen in most entrants to the World Solar Challenge.

| Dimensions (LWH) | 4.5 x 0.8 × 1.1 m |
| Cruising speed | 55 mph |
| Top speed | 88 mph |
| Kerb weight | 120 kg |
| Chassis | Carbon Fibre Monocoque |
| Motor efficiency | 99%+ |

=== Evolution ===
Evolution formed an improvement to the design concept which had been pioneered with Resolution.

| Dimensions (LWH) | 4.5 x 1 × 1 m |
| Cruising speed | 40 mph |
| Top speed | 68 mph |
| Kerb weight | 230 kg |
| Chassis | Carbon Fibre Monocoque |
| Motor efficiency | 99%+ |

== Conferences and sponsorship ==
CUER regularly attends industry conferences. They have been represented at the Raymond James' 4th Annual European Investors North American Equities Conference, and the Exhibition of Advanced Manufacturing and Engineering at Hethel Engineering Centre and Marketforce's 'Renewables 2008'. CUER also exhibited in Cambridge at the ARM Partner Meeting, Cambridge Climate's 'Entrepreneurship for a Zero-Carbon Society' conference and CIR's 'Solar Smart HEAT' event.

Further afield, CUER exhibited amongst the Europe's top 100 Cleantech companies at the Guardian/Library House Essential Cleantech conference, and presented at 'Commercialising Photovoltaics' organised by Renewables East.

== See also ==
- List of solar car teams
