= List of University of Southampton people =

This is a list of University of Southampton people, including famous officers, staff (past and present) and student alumni from the University of Southampton or historical institutions from which the current university derives.

== Officers ==
=== Chancellors ===
==== Hartley Institution and Hartley College ====
Chancellors were known as principals before the formation of University College

- 1862–1873 Francis Bond
- 1873–1874 Charles Blackader
- 1875–1895 Thomas Shore
- 1896–1900 R. Stewart
- 1900–1902 Spencer Richardson

==== University College ====
Chancellors were known as presidents before the formation of university

- 1902–1907 Arthur Wellesley, 4th Duke of Wellington
- 1908–1908 Sir Alfred Wills
- 1910–1913 Claude Montefiore (Acting President)
- 1913–1934 Claude Montefiore
- 1934–1947 Lord John Seely
- 1948–1949 Lord Wyndham Portal
- 1949–1953 Gerald Wellesley, 7th Duke of Wellington

==== University ====
- 1952–1962 Gerald Wellesley, 7th Duke of Wellington
- 1964–1974 Lord Keith Murray
- 1974–1984 Lord Eric Roll
- 1984–1995 Earl George Jellicoe
- 1996–2006 John Palmer, 4th Earl of Selborne
- 2006–2011 Sir John Parker
- 2011–2017 Dame Helen Alexander
- 2019–2024 Ruby Wax
- 1 June 2024 – present: (jointly) Justine Greening and Kamlesh, Lord Patel of Bradford

=== Vice-chancellors ===
==== University College ====
Vice-chancellors were known as principals before the formation of University

- 1902–1912 Spencer Richardson
- 1912–1920 Alexander Hill
- 1920–1922 Thomas Tudor Loveday
- 1922–1946 Kenneth Hotham Vickers
- 1946–1952 Sir Robert Stanford Wood

==== University ====
- 1952–1952 Sir Robert Stanford Wood
- 1952–1965 David Gwilym James
- 1965–1971 Kenneth Mather
- 1971–1979 Laurence Gower
- 1979–1985 John Roberts
- 1985–1994 Sir Gordon Higginson
- 1994–2001 Sir Howard Newby
- 2001–2009 Sir William Wakeham
- 2009–2015 Don Nutbeam
- 2015–2019 Sir Christopher Snowden
- 2019–present Mark Smith

=== Other ===
Selected past and current pro-chancellors

- Sir Henry Tizard
- Sir Samuel Gurney-Dixon
- Sir Basil Schonland
- Sir Bernard Miller
- Lord Edward Shackleton
- Sir Adrian Swire
- Dame Rennie Fritchie
- Dame Yvonne Moores
- William Darwin, first-born son of Charles Darwin; treasurer of the Hartley Institution

== Staff ==
Current and former notable members of academic staff by subject field:

=== Arts ===
Heinz Henghes, modernist sculptor and former head of Fine Art at the Winchester School of Art

- José Antonio Bowen, jazz musician and President of Goucher College
- Pam Cook, author on cinema history
- William Crozier, contemporary still-life and landscape artist
- Michael Finnissy, composer, pianist and former president of the International Society of Contemporary Music
- Michael Zev Gordon, composer
- Heinz Henghes, modernist sculptor
- Aamer Hussein, short story writer and literary critic
- Mark Kermode, film critic
- Nell Leyshon, dramatist and novelist
- Richard Marlow, conductor and former Director of Music at Trinity College, Cambridge
- Ray Monk, biographer and philosophy author
- Frank Prince, poet known for the 1942 poem "Soldiers Bathing"
- Ken Russell, director of Oscar-winning film Women in Love (1969) and The Who's Tommy (1975)

=== Sciences ===
==== Chemistry ====
- Maurice Brookhart, member of National Academy of Sciences
- Ian Croudace, Emeritus Professor of Environmental Radioactivity and Environmental Geochemistry.
- Alan Carrington, winner of the Royal Society of Chemistry Longstaff Medal, Foreign Associate of the United States National Academy of Sciences
- Martin Fleischmann, electrochemist famous for the claimed discovery of cold fusion; past President of the International Society of Electrochemistry
- David James, Bishop of Bradford
- Stanley Pons, electrochemist famous for the claimed discovery of cold fusion

==== Electronics and computer science ====
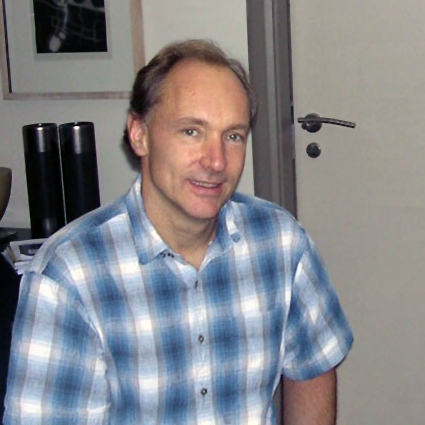
Sir Tim Berners-Lee, World Wide Web inventor

- Michael Butler, expert in formal methods for software engineering, and current dean.
- Sir Tim Berners-Lee, World Wide Web inventor
- Bashir Al-Hashimi, co-director of the ARM-ECS Research Centre.
- Christopher Gutteridge, Open Data innovator
- Dame Wendy Hall, President of the British Computer Society; co-founding Director of the Web Science Research Initiative
- Stevan Harnad Cognitive scientist and external member of the Hungarian Academy of Sciences
- Tony Hey, Corporate Vice-President of Microsoft UK
- Nick Jennings, Regius Professor of Computer Science
- Kirk Martinez, computer scientist; digital imaging and wireless sensor network pioneer
- Luc Moreau, expert in digital provenance
- Kieron O'Hara, philosopher, computer scientist and political writer
- David Payne, member of the team that invented the erbium-doped fibre amplifier EDFA used in fiber optic cables
- Philip Russell, Director of the third division of the Max Planck Research Group
- Sir Nigel Shadbolt, computer scientist; co-founder and Director of the Web Science Research Initiative
- Erich Zepler, pioneering contributor to radio receiver development

==== Mathematics ====
- Brian Bowditch, Geometric group theorist and topologist and winner of the LMS Whitehead Prize
- Ian Diamond, noted statistician, head of the Office for National Statistics and appointed UK National Statistician in 2019.
- Martin Dunwoody, made major contributions in combinatorial and geometric group theory especially in the field of group splittings
- Roy C. Geary, founder of the Central Statistics Office and the Economic and Social Research Institute
- David Guest, Communist British mathematician and philosopher; volunteered to fight in the Spanish Civil War; was killed in Spain in 1938
- Hans Hamburger, formulated the Hamburger moment problem
- Daniel Pedoe, author of several influential books on geometry

==== Ocean and earth science ====
- George Deacon, awarded the Royal Medal of the Royal Society for contributions to physical oceanography and leadership as director of the National Institute of Oceanography

==== Physics and astronomy ====
- Dame Jocelyn Bell Burnell, President of the Institute of Physics
- Sir David Wallace, Director of the Isaac Newton Institute for Mathematical Sciences in Cambridge and master of Churchill College, Cambridge
- Anna Watts, astrophysicist and Professor at University of Amsterdam

=== Engineering ===
- Wing Commander Thomas Reginald Cave-Browne-Cave elder brother of Air Vice Marshal Henry Cave-Browne-Cave; both engineering officers in the Royal Naval Air Service during World War I
- Sir Peter Gregson, Vice Chancellor of Cranfield University, former President and Vice-Chancellor of Queen's University Belfast

=== Medicine ===
- Sir Donald Acheson, former Chief Medical Officer of the United Kingdom
- Michael Arthur, Provost and President of University College London; former Vice-Chancellor of the University of Leeds
- David Barlow, Honorary Research Fellow in Neurophysiology and Emmy Award-winning film-maker
- Terry Hamblin, haematology and immunology expert
- Gerald Kerkut, zoologist and physiologist
- Robert Read, professor of infectious diseases
- Sir Eric Thomas, former Vice-Chancellor of the University of Bristol; chair of the Worldwide Universities Network

=== Nursing and midwifery ===
- Dame Jill Macleod Clark, President of the Infection Control Nursing Association
- Dame Jessica Corner, Dean (since 2010) of the Faculty of Health Sciences; Professor (since 2008) of Cancer and Palliative Care at the University of Southampton

=== Social sciences ===
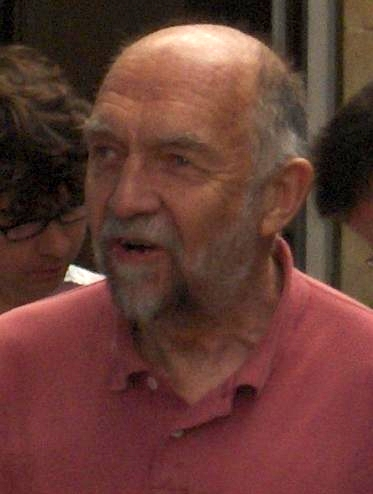
Sir Alan Budd, economist and founding member of the Bank of England's Monetary Policy Committee

- Sir Alan Budd, economist, founding member of the Bank of England's Monetary Policy Committee
- Nitin Desai, economist and United Nations Under-Secretary-General for Economic and Social Affairs
- Sir Ian Diamond, UK National Statistician, formerly Principal and Vice-Chancellor of the University of Aberdeen and Chief Executive of Economic and Social Research Council
- Clive Gamble, archaeologist and anthropologist specialising in human origins, and a trustee of the British Museum
- Paul Geroski, economist and former member of Monopolies and Mergers Commission
- Jan Haaland, Rector of the Norwegian School of Economics and Business Administration
- Alan Hamlin, economist and political theorist
- Tim Holt, former President of the Royal Statistical Society and Office for National Statistics
- Christopher Janaway, philosopher specialising in the work of Nietzsche; publishing through OUP Oxford, his most recent work is Beyond Selflessness: Reading Nietzsche's Genealogy
- Maurice Kugler, Colombian economist; CIGI Chair in International Public Policy;Visiting Professor of Public Policy at the John F. Kennedy School of Government
- Harold Lawton, former Pro Vice-Chancellor of University of Sheffield; thought to have been the last surviving Allied soldier captured on the Western Front
- Jakob Broechner Madsen, economist, professor, former financial analyst, deputy chief economist at the Bank of Jutland
- James M. Malcomson, economist specialising in labour economics and contract theory
- David Pearce, pioneer of environmental economics; chief environmental adviser to the UK Secretaries of State, 1989-1992; a convening lead author of the Intergovernmental Panel on Climate Change
- Christopher Pissarides, Nobel Laureate in Economics
- Colin Renfrew, Baron Renfrew of Kaimsthorn, archaeologist
- Howard Root, Professor of Theology
- Raymond Plant, Baron Plant of Highfield, Labour peer; Professor of Jurisprudence and Political Philosophy at King's College London
- Steve Smith, Vice-Chancellor, University of Exeter; Chair of the Board of the 1994 Group
- T. M. Fred Smith, former President of the Royal Statistical Society
- Donald Tyerman, former editor of The Economist
- Peter Ucko, founder of the World Archaeological Congress
- Paul Webley, Director and Principal of the School of Oriental and African Studies, University of London
- Richard Werner, Professor of Finance, known for his theory of quantitative easing

==== Geography ====
- Florence Clark Miller, lecturer in Geography from 1921 and head of the Geography Department from 1949
- Sir Paul Curran, current Vice-Chancellor of City University London; former Vice-Chancellor of Bournemouth University; recipient of the Patron's Medal of the Royal Geographical Society

==== History ====
- David Cesarani, historian specialising in Jewish history
- Sir Barry Cunliffe, former President of Council for British Archaeology (1976–79); interim chair of English Heritage
- Anne Curry, historian, Dean of Faculty of Humanities
- Miriam Daly, Irish republican activist and historian
- David Quinn, historian who specialised in the discovery and colonisation of America
- Robert Young, post-colonial theorist and historian

==== Law ====
- Malcolm Grant, Provost and president of University College London
- Alastair Hudson, Professor of Equity and Finance Law
- Dame Judith Mayhew, former provost of King's College, Cambridge; on the board of directors at Merrill Lynch
- Albie Sachs, former Judge of the Constitutional Court of South Africa

== Students ==
Former notable students at Southampton include:

=== Academia ===
- Jackie Akhavan, chemist, Fellow of the Royal Society of Chemistry and head of the Centre for Defence Chemistry at Cranfield University
- Richard Aldridge, former President of the Palaeontological Association
- Joanna Bauldreay, British chemist and Aviation Fuel Development Manager at Shell Global Solutions
- Anthony Cohen, Vice-Chancellor of Queen Margaret University, Edinburgh
- Shanaka L de Silva, geologist, academic and author.
- Kairbaan Hodivala-Dilke, cell biologist, medical researcher, and academic at Barts and The London School of Medicine and Dentistry
- Sir Christopher Ingold, chemist, recipient of the Longstaff Medal of the Royal Society of Chemistry in 1951 and the Royal Medal of the Royal Society in 1952
- David Jones, Flavelle Medal–winning biologist
- Sir Harold Marshall, acoustician, Knight of the New Zealand Order of Merit, Fellow of the Royal Society of New Zealand, awarded Wallace Clement Sabine Medal in 1995 and Rayleigh Medal in 2015
- Phil Moorby, computer scientist and recipient of the Phil Kaufman Award
- Zohrah Sulaiman, Vice-Chancellor of Universiti Teknologi Brunei
- Antony Sutton, economist who published on controversial topics such as the West's role in developing Soviet Union, Wall Street's involvement in the Russian Revolution and the rise of Adolf Hitler and the University of Yale's Skull and Bones Society
- Adrian Tinniswood, author, historian and educationalist
- Nigel Weatherill, engineer, Vice-Chancellor and Chief Executive of Liverpool John Moores University
- Colin White, historian and Director of the Royal Naval Museum
- Ashraf El-Shihy, former Minister of Higher Education, Minister of Scientific Research, and a University President/Chancellor in Egypt.
- Christine Patch, nurse and genetic counsellor, Clinical Lead for Genetic Counselling at Genomics England and former President of the European Society of Human Genetics

=== Arts ===
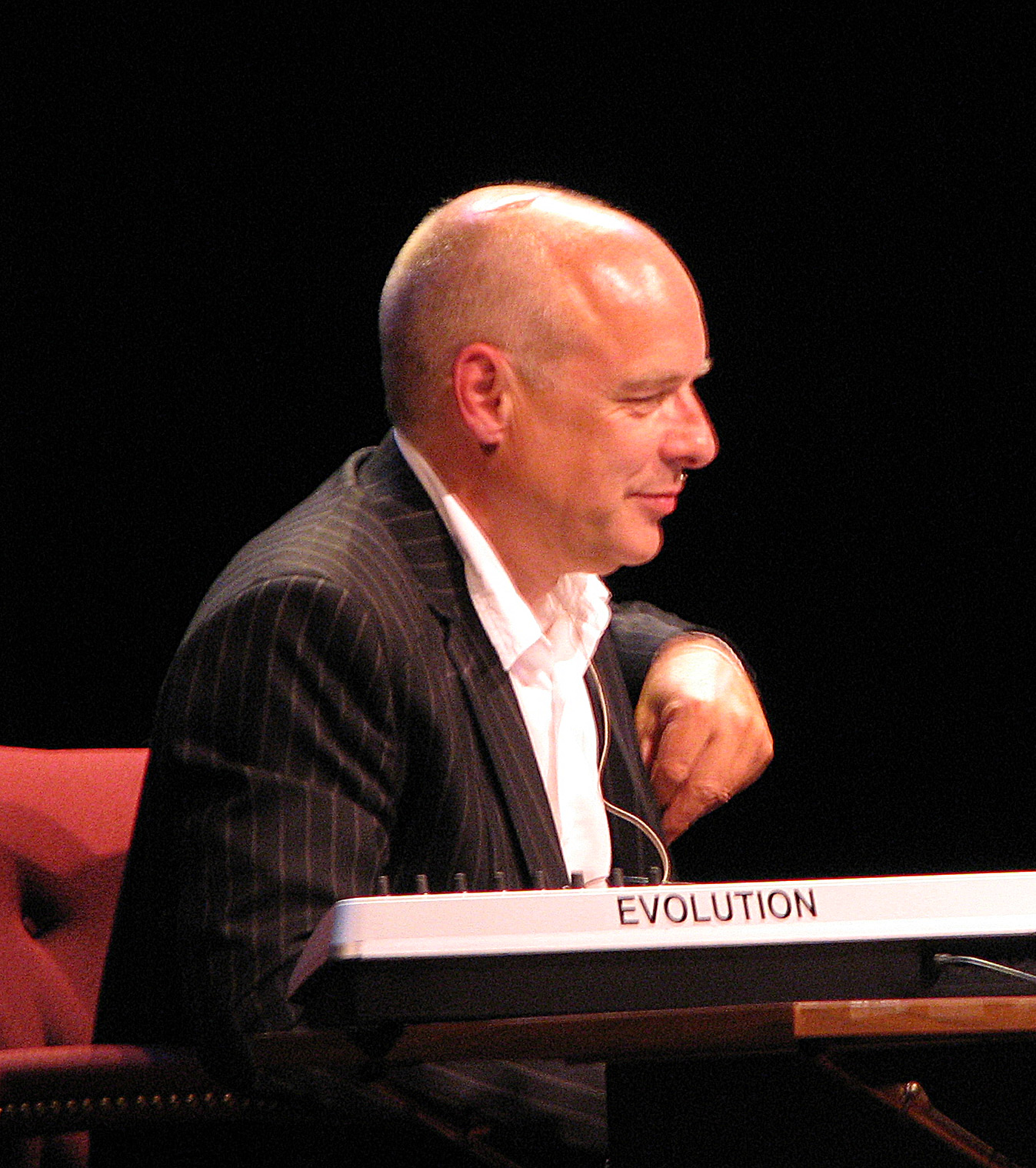
Brian Eno, alumnus of Winchester School of Art

- Ritu Arya, actress best known for her role in The Umbrella Academy
- Darren Almond, artist working in film, installation, sculpture and photography; nominated for the 2005 Turner Prize
- Stephen Baxter, award-winning science fiction author
- Stephen Baysted, composer of video game soundtracks
- Martin Bell, poet and founder member of The Group
- John Buckley, sculptor, creator of the Headington Shark
- James Castle, draughtsman and sculptor; Invited Artist at Royal West of England Academy
- Daniel Catán, composer of Florencia en el Amazonas
- Ronald Cavaye, pianist and music author
- James Clarke, composer of Voices in collaboration with Harold Pinter
- Stephen Deuchar, Director of Tate Britain
- Brian Eno, electronic music pioneer, recording artist and producer
- Kodwo Eshun a British-Ghanaian writer, theorist and filmmaker.
- Aaron Fletcher, musician in The Bees
- Anne Hardy, artist best known for her large-scale photographic work of unusual interior spaces
- Jeremy Hardy, winner of the Perrier Comedy Award in 1988
- Mark Hill, record producer; member of Artful Dodger band
- Mick Jackson, director of L.A. Story and Volcano
- Stephen Jeffreys, playwright of The Libertine
- Edward Kluz, artist, illustrator and printmaker
- Marek Larwood, comedian in BBC Three sitcom Rush Hour
- Paul Lee, sculptor
- Robin Maconie, composer, pianist, and writer
- Dominic Muldowney, composer and former music director of the Royal National Theatre
- John Nettles, actor best known for playing the main roles in Bergerac and Midsomer Murders
- James Saunders, playwright and writer of BBC sitcom Bloomers
- Rosemary Squire, co-founder and Executive Director of the Ambassador Theatre Group
- Pauline Stainer, poet
- Linda Sutton, artist and regular exhibitor at the Royal Academy of Arts Summer Exhibition
- Antony G. Sweeney, former director of the Australian Centre for the Moving Image

=== Business ===
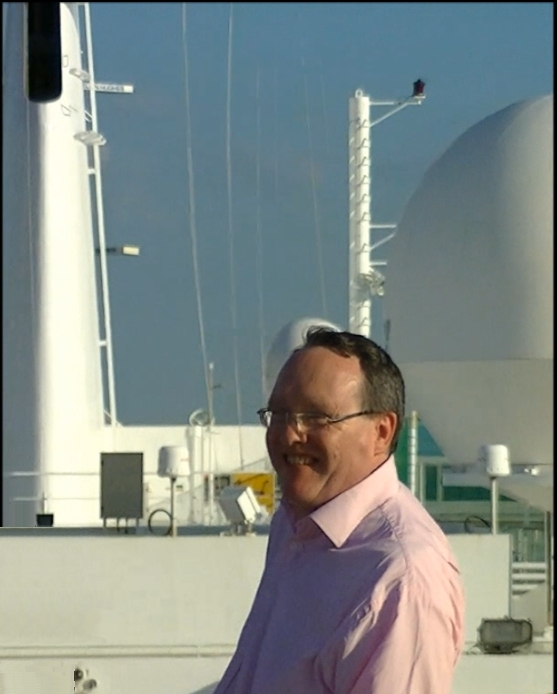
Stephen Payne on board the RMS Queen Mary 2 in July 2013

- George Buckley, Chairman, President, and Chief Executive of 3M
- Richard Cuthbertson, Research Director of the Oxford Institute of Retail Management, Oxford University
- Tom Delay, climate economist and former Chief Executive of the Carbon Trust.
- Grahaeme Henderson, engineer and maritime executive; Fellow of the Royal Academy of Engineering
- Chris Hohn, founder of The Children's Investment Fund Management; Britain's biggest charity donor
- Hosein Khajeh-Hosseiny, founder of OpenX Innovations, trustee of The Brookings Institution
- Frederick Lanchester, co-founder of the Lanchester Motor Company
- Christopher Orlebar, former British Airways Concorde pilot
- Chai Patel, former Chief Executive of the Priory Healthcare group
- Stephen Payne, maritime consultant and former Vice-President and Chief Naval Architect at Carnival Corporation (owners of Cunard)
- Stuart Popham, senior partner at Clifford Chance
- Peter Tertzakian, Chief Energy Economist of ARC Financial Corporation
- Justin Urquhart Stewart, Co-founder of 7IM, investment company and well known Business commentator. University has a bursary award named after him.

=== Politics and public life ===
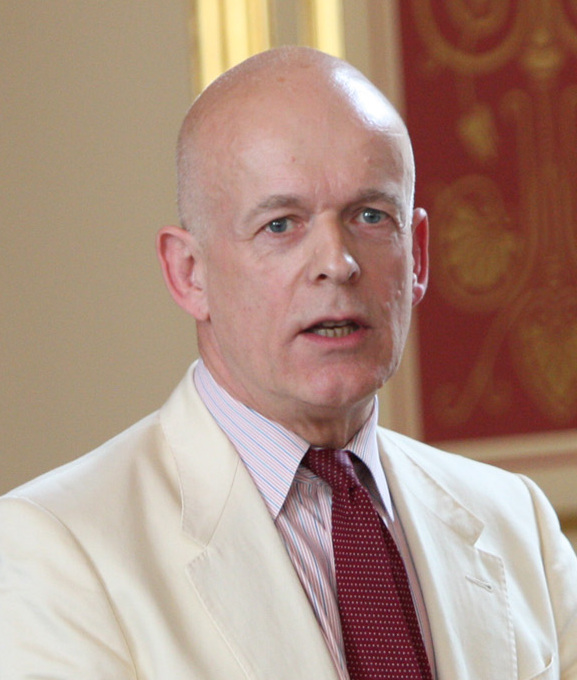
Sir Adrian Fulford, Judge of the International Criminal Court

- Baroness Liz Barker, Liberal Democrat Life Peer
- Sir Conor Burns, former Member of Parliament for Bournemouth West
- Grenville Cross, Director of Public Prosecutions of Hong Kong, China
- John Denham, Labour Member of Parliament for Southampton Itchen; Secretary of State for Innovation, Universities and Skills
- Evan Enwerem, former president of the Senate of Nigeria
- Mohammed Lutfi Farhat, Member of the Pan-African Parliament from Libya; the Parliament's North African Vice President
- Astrid Fischel Volio, Vice-President of Costa Rica
- Sir Adrian Fulford, Judge of the International Criminal Court
- Justine Greening, ConservativeFormer Member of Parliament for Putney; Former Secretary of State for Education and Minister for Women and Equalities
- Karl-Theodor zu Guttenberg, former German Minister of Defence
- Baroness Gloria Hooper, lawyer and Life peer in the House of Lords
- Rima Horton, Labour Party councillor on the Kensington and Chelsea London Borough Council from 1986 to 2006.
- Gerald Howarth, Conservative former Member of Parliament for Aldershot; Shadow Minister for Secretary of State for Defence
- Jason Hu, Mayor of Taichung City and former foreign minister of the Republic of China
- David Kurten, Leader of the Heritage Party
- Usutuaije Maamberua, Namibian politician, head of the South West Africa National Union
- Glyn Mathias, former Electoral Commissioner of the United Kingdom
- Bob Mitchell, former Labour Member of Parliament for Southampton Test; Social Democratic Party Member of Parliament for Southampton Itchen
- Paul Ovenden, former Downing Street Head of Political Strategy
- Peter Price, honorary Member of the European Parliament; member of the European Strategy Council
- Geoffrey Rowland, Bailiff of Guernsey
- Arnold Shaw, former Labour Member of Parliament for Ilford South
- Viscount Jan David Simon, Labour Member of the House of Lords
- Lord Clive Soley, Labour Member of the House of Lords
- Sir John Stevens, former head of the Metropolitan Police Service; current international security advisor to the prime minister
- Matthew Taylor, chief executive of the Royal Society of Arts
- Lord George Thomas, former Speaker of the House of Commons; Labour Member of Parliament for Cardiff Central and Cardiff West
- Richard Thomas, Information Commissioner and former director of public policy at Clifford Chance law firm
- Melchior Wathelet Jr., former Belgian Minister of the Interior
- Alan Whitehead, Labour Member of Parliament for Southampton Test
- William Whitlock, former Labour Member of Parliament for Nottingham North
- Sheila Wright, former Labour Member of Parliament for Birmingham Handsworth

=== Media ===
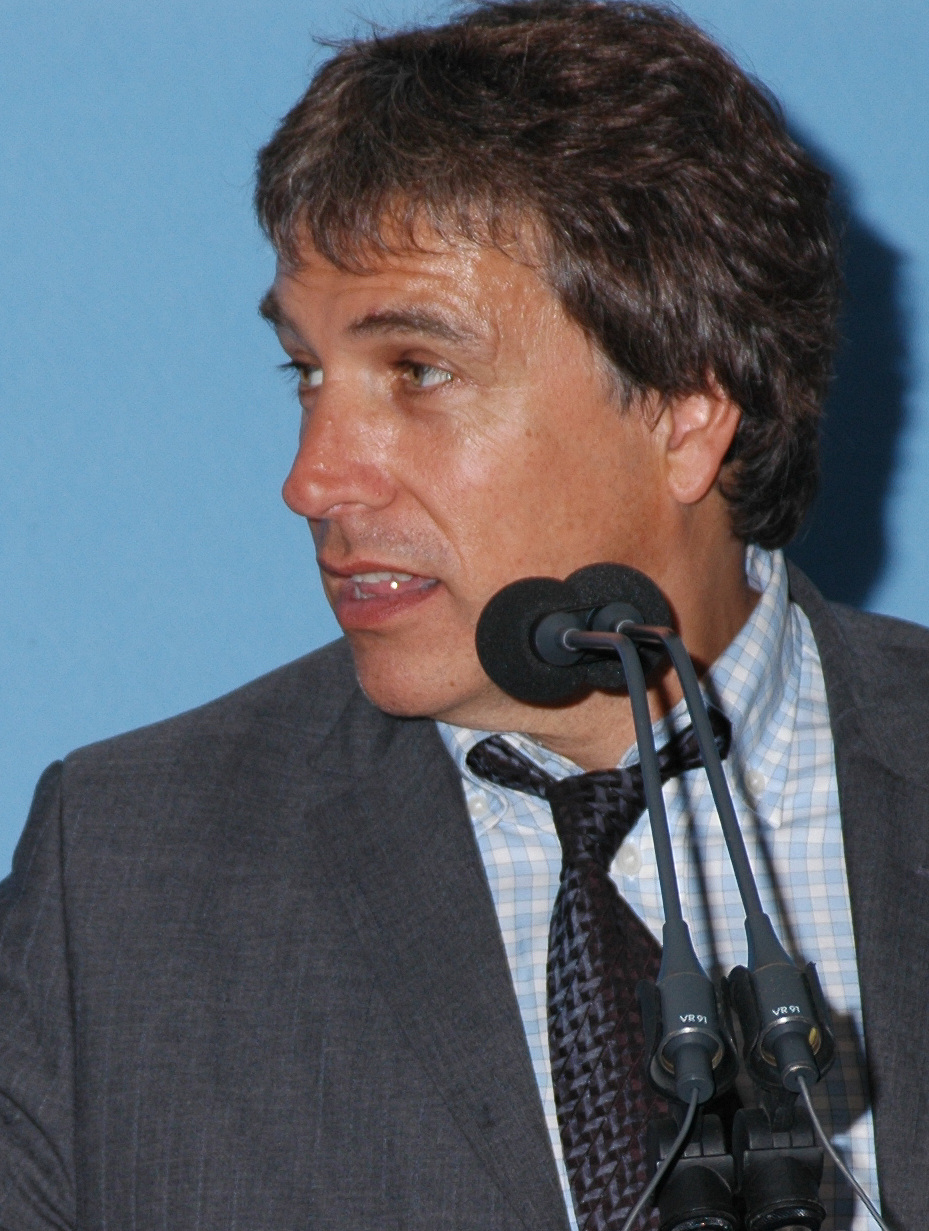
John Inverdale, sports broadcaster

- Laura Bailey, model and fashion writer
- Liz Barker, former Blue Peter presenter
- Andrea Benfield, co-anchor of Wales Tonight
- Alex Brummer, financial commentator; City Editor for The Mail on Sunday and the Daily Mail newspapers
- Stefan Buczacki, horticulturalist, radio and TV expert
- William Frank Kobina Coleman, Director General of the Ghana Broadcasting Corporation (1960–1970)
- Jason Cowley, editor for the New Statesman magazine
- David Cracknell, former Political Editor for the Sunday Times newspaper
- Jon Craig, Chief Political Correspondent for Sky News
- John Inverdale, sports broadcaster for the BBC
- Glyn Mathias, Political Editor of Independent Television News (1981-1986) and BBC Wales (1994-1999); the Electoral Commission's Commissioner for Wales (2001-2008); board member of OFCOM (2011–present)
- Dominic Mohan, editor of the newspaper The Sun
- Chris Packham, naturalist and television presenter for Inside Out in the South
- Daniel Sandford, Home Affairs Correspondent for the BBC
- Jon Sopel, presenter of The Politics Show; a lead presenter on BBC News 24
- Kathy Tayler, former presenter of Holiday on the BBC
- Stella Tennant, modeled for Chanel, Calvin Klein, Hermès and Burberry
- Srđa Trifković, foreign affairs editor for the Chronicles magazine and director of the Center for International Affairs at the Rockford Institute
- Caroline Wyatt, Religious correspondent for the BBC

=== Military ===
- Air Vice Marshal Arthur Button, former Senior Commander in the Royal Air Force
- Admiral Tony Radakin, First Sea Lord, appointed as Chief of the Defence Staff
- Air Commodore Ian Stewart, Commandant of the Air Cadet Organisation
- Admiral Sir George Zambellas, First Sea Lord; awarded the Distinguished Service Cross in 2000
- Vice Admiral Sir Jeremy Paul Kyd, Former Fleet Commander in the Royal Navy; currently Lieutenant Governor of Jersey.

=== Religion ===
- Anjem Choudary, Muslim preacher
- David Hallatt, former Bishop of Shrewsbury
- Lee Rayfield, Bishop of Swindon
- Tim Thornton, Bishop of Truro

=== Sport ===
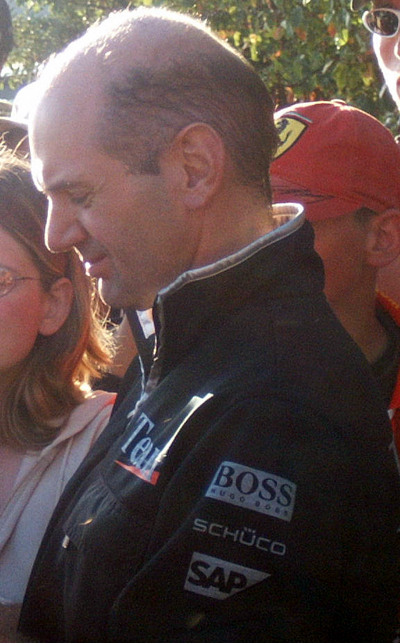
Adrian Newey, Technical Director of Red Bull Racing

- Guin Batten, won silver at the 2000 Summer Olympics in the quadruple scull; set the record for the fastest solo crossing of the English Channel in a rowing shell
- Miriam Batten, won silver at the 2000 Summer Olympics in the quadruple scull
- Roger Black; 400m athlete; European, Commonwealth and World Championship gold medalist
- Pavlos Kontides, sailor; won silver medal at the 2012 Summer Olympics in the Men's Laser class
- Tim Male, rower in the 2004 Summer Olympics
- Adrian Newey, Technical Director, Red Bull Racing Formula One team
- Jon Potter, member of the gold-winning British field hockey squad at the 1988 Summer Olympics and bronze winning squad at the 1984 Summer Olympics
- John Smith, former Pro-Bowl placekicker for the New England Patriots of the NFL
- Harry Tarraway, Olympian at the 1948 Olympic Games
- Mark Taylor, former captain of Wales national rugby union team
- Robert Tobin, part of the silver medal-winning 4×400 relay team at the 2009 World Athletic Championships in Berlin
- Bruce Tulloh, 5000m athlete; won gold medal at the 1962 European Championships in bare feet
- Lawrence Wallace, medal winner at the 1938 Empire Games
- Rob White, deputy managing director engine at Renault F1
- Daniel Wright, referee at the 2008 European Lacrosse Championship and 2010 World Lacrosse Championship

=== Other ===
- T. Q. Armar, Ghanaian publisher
- Kevin Ashman, international Mastermind champion
- Sally Clark, lawyer, convicted for the murder of her two children in 1999, subsequently quashed on appeal in 2003; notable for the involvement of Sir Roy Meadow and Munchausen Syndrome by Proxy
- Katy Croff Bell, National Geographic Explorer
- George Hersee, BBC engineer responsible for development of Test Card F
- June Jolly, children's nurse
- Anna Murray, women's health doctor
- Scott Mills, Radio One DJ; involved with Southampton University's radio station, Surge, although never a student at the University
- Gerry del-Guercio, Richard Hanson, Neil Higton, John Maskell and Alexei Roszkowiak, members of indie rock band SixNationState, formed whilst studying sociology at Southampton
- Jeremy Stangroom, writer, editor, and website designer
- Christopher Stark, British radio personality known for his work as a co-host on the Scott Mills show on BBC Radio 1.
- Jane Wilson-Howarth author

== Fictional characters ==
- Alice Aldridge, character in The Archers, studying for an aeronautical engineering degree
