= Maria Bitner-Glindzicz =

British physician and professor of genetics

Professor Maria Bitner-Glindzicz
- Born: 26 June 1963; Fleetwood, England
- Died: 20 September 2018 (aged 55); Royal London Hospital, England
- Education: University College London
- Known for: Clinical Genetics
- Spouse: David Miles
- Scientific career
- Fields: Genetics; 100,000 Genomes Project; Norrie disease; Usher syndrome
- Workplaces: Guy's Hospital; University College London; Great Ormond Street Hospital

Maria Bitner-Glindzicz (26 June 1963 – 20 September 2018) was a British medical doctor, honorary consultant in clinical genetics at Great Ormond Street Hospital, and a professor of human and molecular genetics at the UCL Institute of Child Health. The hospital described her work as relating to the "genetic causes of deafness in children and therapies that she hoped would one day restore vision." She researched Norrie disease and Usher syndrome, working with charities including Sparks and the Norrie Disease Foundation, and was one of the first colleagues involved in the 100,000 Genomes Project at Genomics England.

She died after she was doored by a van and then hit by a taxi in London.

== Education ==
Bitner-Glindzicz attended Rendcomb College, a boarding school in Gloucestershire, while her parents lived in Hong Kong. She received her medical (MBBS) degree from University College London in 1987, also achieving a first-class intercalated degree. She began to consider a career in clinical genetics upon qualifying, later going on to complete a PhD funded through an MRC Clinical Research Fellowship. Her research interests were the genetic causes of deafness in children and adults, such as Norrie disease and Usher syndrome.

== Career ==
Her research group at the UCL Institute of Child Health, in collaboration with others in Europe, identified a number of genes responsible for syndromic and non-syndromic forms of deafness, including X-linked deafness, the cardio-auditory syndrome, and Usher syndrome. Their research explored the expression and functional effects of mutations identified in these genes in patients in order to understand how they give rise to disease. Bitner-Glindzicz's work on Usher syndrome initiated the National Collaborative Usher Study, a large clinical and molecular study of people with Usher syndrome in the UK, in collaboration with Karen Steel at the Wellcome Trust Sanger Institute.

In addition, she was interested in ototoxicity and the mechanisms and genetic basis of this, exploring whether near-bedside genetic testing for mutations predisposing to ototoxicity was feasible. Her work led to improvements in clinical services for patients, including more comprehensive molecular diagnosis for deafness, and specialist clinics in and around London. These included genetic deafness clinics at Great Ormond Street Hospital and the Royal National Throat Nose and Ear Hospital, as well as a joint sensory clinic for patients with dual sensory impairment at the National Hospital for Neurology and Neurosurgery with Linda Luxon, Andrew Webster, and representatives from Sense.

Bitner-Glindzicz was one of the earliest colleagues to be involved with the 100,000 Genomes Project at Genomics England. She published over 175 articles on her research. Alongside her clinical and research work, she supported charities including Sparks and was the driving force behind the setting up of the Norrie Disease Foundation. She was described by Great Ormond Street Hospital as a genuine advocate for her patients and an articulate voice who tirelessly pushed for greater support for children affected by sight and hearing impairments.

== Death ==
At 11:30 BST on 19 September 2018, Bitner-Glindzicz was cycling along St John Street in the Borough of Islington when she was struck by an opened door of a stationary van. This caused her to be knocked off her bike, subsequently being hit by a taxi in the process of overtaking her, dragging her 18m down to road. Bitner-Glindzicz died of multiple injuries at the Royal London Hospital the next day.

On 1 April 2019, the driver of the van was charged with opening his door so as to "injure or endanger" and was due to appear at Highbury Corner Magistrates' Court later in the month. The driver of the van died in his sleep two days before the court case, leading to proceedings being discontinued.

Following an inquest in to the death of Bitner-Glindzicz, senior coroner Mary Hassell stated, "She was cycling in a safe and steady manner wearing a helmet and fluorescent strap. Her bike was in good condition. The van driver didn't look before opening the driver's door sharply. The result was either that Professor Bitner-Glindzicz has to swerve suddenly, or that she was sideswiped. In either event, the opening of the door caused her to fall under the wheels of a black cab overtaking."

== Personal life ==
Maria Bitner-Glindzicz lived in London. She was married to professor of medical oncology David Miles, with one daughter and one son.
