= Ewa Deelman =

American computer scientist

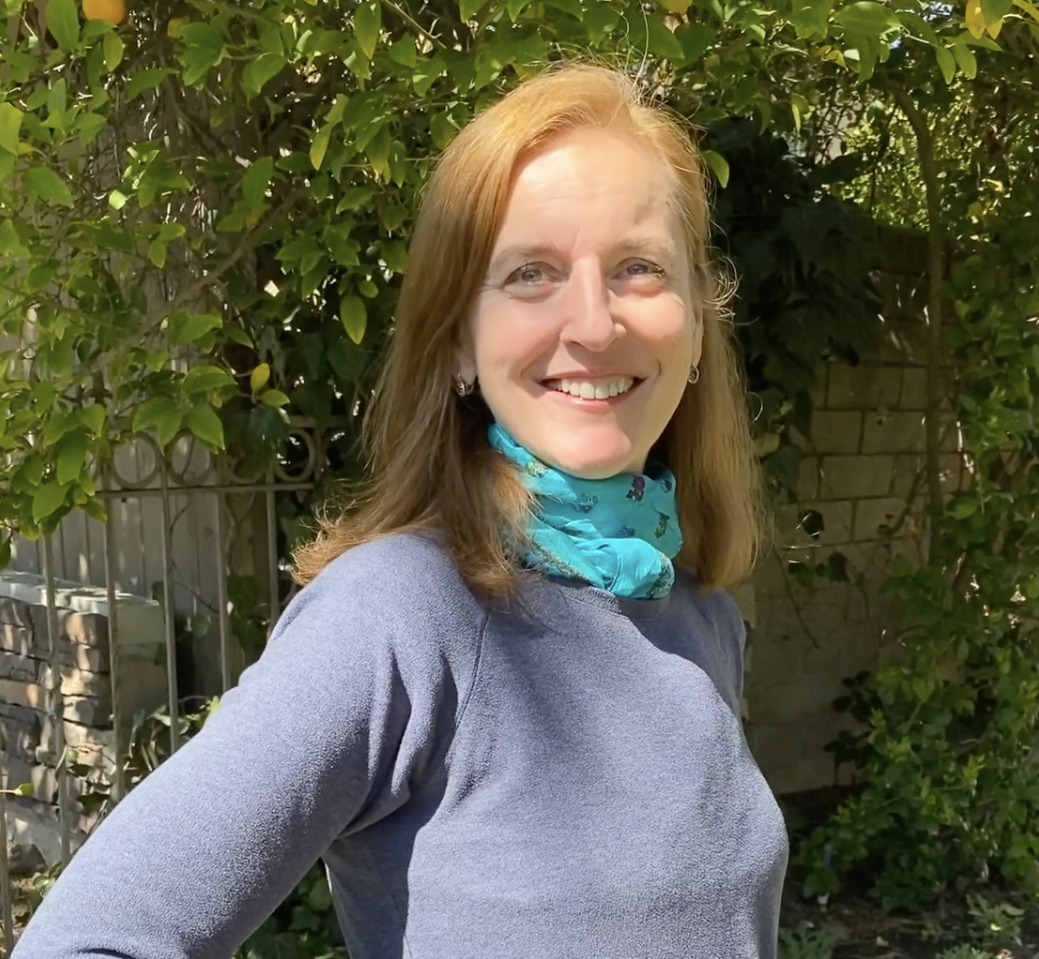
Ewa Deelman. American Research Professor of computer science

Ewa Deelman is an American computer scientist specializing in distributed computing and cloud computing for applications in scientific computing. Her contributions include leading the design of the Pegasus scientific workflow management system, used by the LIGO scientific collaboration to detect gravitational waves from binary black holes. She is a research professor of computer science in the USC Viterbi School of Engineering, and a principal scientist at the Information Sciences Institute, both part of the University of Southern California.

== Recognition ==
Deelman was the 2015 recipient of the HPDC Achievement Award, given with an invitation for a keynote address at the International ACM Symposium on High-Performance Parallel and Distributed Computing, "for her significant influence, contributions, and distinguished use of workflow systems in high-performance computing".

She was elected as an IEEE Fellow, in the 2018 class of fellows, "for contributions to scientific workflow management". She was named as a Fellow of the American Association for the Advancement of Science in 2019, "particularly for the design and optimization of scientific workflows in distributed and high-performance environments".

== Selected publications ==
- Abbott, Benjamin P.; Abbott, Richard; Abbott, Thomas D.; et al. (2017), "GW170104: Observation of a 50-Solar-Mass Binary Black Hole Coalescence at Redshift 0.2", Physical Review Letters, 118 (22) 221101, arXiv:1706.01812, Bibcode:2017PhRvL.118v1101A, doi:10.1103/physrevlett.118.221101, PMID 28621973, Wikidata Q30105981 (Erratum: doi:10.1103/physrevlett.121.129901, PMID 30296111, Wikidata Q57191631)
- Dmitry Shungin; Winkler, Thomas; Damien C Croteau-Chonka; et al. (2015), "New genetic loci link adipose and insulin biology to body fat distribution", Nature, 518 (7538): 187–196, Bibcode:2015Natur.518..187., doi:10.1038/nature14132, PMC 4338562, PMID 25673412, Wikidata Q35114362
- Gil, Yolanda; Deelman, Ewa; Mark Ellisman; Thomas Fahringer; Geoffrey Fox; Dennis Gannon; Goble, Carole; Miron Livny; Moreau, Luc; Jim Myers (2007), "Examining the Challenges of Scientific Workflows", Computer, 40 (12): 24–32, doi:10.1109/mc.2007.421, Wikidata Q56966930
