= Christine Patch =

Nurse and genetic counsellor

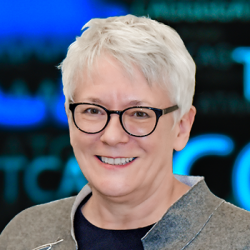
- Education: University of Southampton (PhD)
- Scientific career
- Workplaces: National Health Service; Guy's and St Thomas' NHS Foundation Trust; King's College London; Wellcome Connecting Science; Genomics England
- Website: societyandethicsresearch.wellcomeconnectingscience.org/staff/christine-patch

Christine Patch is a nurse and genetic counsellor. She is a Principal Staff Scientist in Genomic Counselling in the Society and Ethics Research group, part of Wellcome Connecting Science, based on the Wellcome Genome Campus. She is also the Clinical Lead for Genetic Counselling at Genomics England, and a former President of the European Society of Human Genetics.

== Education ==
Patch studied Psychology at the University of Southampton, followed by a PhD in Public Health and Medical Statistics.

== Career and research ==
Christine Patch began her career as a nurse, eventually becoming a Consultant Genetic Counsellor and Manager at Guy's and St Thomas NHS Foundation Trust, where she led and developed the clinical genetics service at Guy's Hospital. She was also a Reader in the Florence Nightingale Faculty of Nursing and Midwifery at King's College London.

As the Clinical Lead for Genetic Counselling at Genomics England, Patch is responsible for considering how resources are used to support patients and families who have received a genetic diagnosis from the 100,000 Genomes Project manage the impact of genetic information on their lives. Patch is also the Caldicott guardian for Genomics England, ensuring that appropriate governance relating to confidentiality and data sharing for genomic healthcare and research in the NHS, is in place. She is a member of Wellcome Connecting Science's Society and Ethics Research group, which is led by Professor Anna Middleton.

Patch is also the Co-Lead of the Steering Group for the Global Genomics Nursing Alliance.

She has extensive research interests in genetic testing, communication and counselling, investigating how the responsible uses of new technologies can deliver effective, patient and family-focused, health services. Recent work has included exploring the attitudes of young people to DNA sequencing, rare disease diagnosis and decision making; and assessing the views of healthcare professionals with experience of offering genome sequencing via the 100,000 Genomes Project.

=== Honours and awards ===
Patch was the Chair of the British Society for Genetic Medicine (2009-2011); and the President of European Society of Human Genetics (2017-2018), and remains an ESHG Board member. She is also a Trustee of the Progress Educational Trust.
