= Guttenplan =

Guttenplan is a surname. Notable people with the surname include:

- Samuel Guttenplan (born 1944), editor-in-chief of Mind & Language
- D. D. Guttenplan, London correspondent for The Nation
