= James Castle =

James Castle may refer to:

- James Castle (politician) (1836–1903), U.S. Representative from Minnesota
- James Bicknell Castle (1855–1918), businessman in Hawaii
- James Charles Castle (1899–1977), American artist-bookmaker from Idaho
- James Castle (sculptor) (born 1946), Scottish sculptor
- James Castle (wrestler) (1988–2024), English professional wrestler
- J. R. Castle (born 1959), former American lacrosse player
- Jimmy Castle, a character in the film Dirty Dancing
- James Castle, title designer for Castle Bryant Johnsen
