= Shanaka =

Shanaka is a Sri Lankan name. It may refer to:

== Given name ==
- Shanaka Fernando (born 1968), Australian restaurateur
- Shanaka Peters (born 1991), Sri Lankan weightlifter
- Shanaka Sampath (born 1991), Sri Lankan cricketer
- Shanaka L de Silva, British-American geologist

== Surname ==
- Dasun Shanaka (born 1991), Sri Lankan cricketer
