= Margaret Graeme Niven =

British artist (1906-1997)

- Born: 1906; Marlow, Buckinghamshire, England
- Died: 1997 (aged 90–91)
- Education: Winchester School of Art; Heatherley School of Fine Art
- Known for: Painting

Margaret Graeme Niven (1906–1997) was a British painter of landscapes, portraits and flowers.

== Biography ==
Niven was born in Marlow in Buckinghamshire. Her father was the architect William Niven and she attended the Winchester School of Art, the Heatherley School of Fine Art and also took lessions from Bernard Adams. Her career as an artist included exhibitions at several commercial galleries including Cooling's plus the Leicester and Wildenstein galleries and she also took part in group exhibitions at the Royal Academy in London. She was a member of the Royal Society of British Artists and was also elected a member of both the National Society of Painters, Sculptors and Gravers, in 1932, and the Royal Institute of Oil Painters in 1936. Cartwright Hall gallery hold examples of her work as do Homerton College in Cambridge and the United Kingdom Government Art Collection.
