= Kenneth Hotham Vickers =

20th-century British historian and university administrator

Kenneth Hotham Vickers (11 May 1881 – 5 September 1958) was an English historian and university administrator. From 1922–1946 he was Principal of Southampton University College which became the University of Southampton in 1952.

== Early life ==
He was born at Naburn, near York, where his father, the Revd Randall William Vickers, was then vicar. He was youngest of a family of four, with a brother and two sisters. He attended Oundle School in Northamptonshire but aged 15 contracted polio and was left with a weak arm and leg. He won a scholarship in history to Exeter College, Oxford, graduating in 1904.

== Career ==
From 1905-1908 he lectured in History at University College, Bristol. From 1907–09 he lectured in history for the London County Council and was a tutor for the University of London from 1908-1913. He became a fellow of the Royal Historical Society in 1909. In 1913 he became Professor of Modern History at Armstrong College a college of the University of Durham which was based in Newcastle and now part of Newcastle University.

In 1922 Vickers became Principal of the University College of Southampton taking retirement in 1946. His objective was to get full university status. New building was critical as there was only one brick building and then wooden huts – the legacy of the First World War, with newly built building being need for use as hospitals. Lack of money was a major continuing problem into the late 1930s. By 1939 however a now students' union building and a new library had been establish, science departments re-housed and halls of residence established. The Second World War suspended development but full university status was established in 1952 by his successor.

== Personal life ==
In 1911 he married Alice Margretha Crossman (died 1948) and they had two sons of whom one died in infancy.

== Works ==
- Humphrey, Duke of Gloucester: A Biography (1907)
- England in the Later Middle Ages (1913; 7th ed. 1950) - the 3rd volume (of 8) in Charles Oman's A History of England series
- A Short History of London (1914)
- A History of Northumberland: Volume XI (1922)

== See also ==
- List of University of Southampton people

Academic offices
Preceded by Thomas Loveday	Principal of Southampton University College; 1922-1946	Succeeded by Sir Robert Stanford Wood
