= Lauren Aston =

English businesswoman

- Education: Winchester School of Art
- Occupations: Businesswoman and designer
- Years active: 2014–present
- Organisation: Lauren Aston Designs

Lauren Aston is an English businesswoman and designer, who runs her self-titled Lauren Aston Designs (LAD) business in Exeter, Devon, from a tiny studio in her loft. She has created and knitted garments from the studio since 2014. Examples of people that have bought her products include Claudia Winkleman and the Beckhams.

== Early life and career ==
Aston was taught to knit by her grandmother while she was 11 years old. When Aston first started, she originally tried and gave up. Aston later studied fashion and design at university at the Winchester School of Art. She has since graduated with a degree in knitwear and moved to Devon. Located in Exeter, Devon, Aston has since established and runs her self-titled Lauren Aston Designs from a tiny studio in her loft in 2014. She creates various garments such as blankets using merino wool as she is allergic to some wool types and finds merino 'amazingly soft' and 'hypoallergenic'.

David and Victoria Beckham bought six of Aston's large handmade stockings for Christmas in 2017. She felt 'stunned' after discovering it. Her stockings have appeared on the Beckhams' social media accounts almost every year since.

Her business was originally located at the railway station in Topsham, just south of Exeter, before relocating to the Quayside in July 2023. This was due to the fact that her workers rarely welcomed customers due to the limited space available. Her business was led by herself and nine other women as of October 2023.

One of her green hand-knitted jumpers was worn by broadcaster Claudia Winkleman in the second series of the reality TV series The Traitors from the BBC One in January 2026. She normally expects 10 or 12 of them to be sold in a year, but as a result of the event, it only took two days to reach that and had 100 commissions within a month. That event has been dubbed the 'Claudia Effect'.

In June 2026, copycat retailers made her lose "tens of thousands of pounds". Aston had spent "so many hours trying to send out cease and desists" letters and contacted people to remove it. She noted after a little while that chasing it made her lose even more "because it's like trying to catch water in your hands". She also published her book titled Dopamine Knitting on 22 October 2026 in the UK and is set to publish it on 17 February 2027 internationally.

== Personal life ==
Although her business is located in Devon, Aston lives in Hagley, Worcestershire, as of 2026. She has a boyfriend named Alex.
