= Samuel Guttenplan =

British philosopher

Samuel D. Guttenplan (born 1944 in New York City) is a professor in philosophy at Birkbeck, University of London. Guttenplan earned his DPhil from the University of Oxford with a dissertation directed by John McDowell. He has interests in the philosophies of mind, language, philosophical logic and ethics. His current work centres on the origins of human conceptual thought, and he is contracted to produce The Roots of Categorization for Oxford University Press in 2009–10.

He is executive editor of the interdisciplinary journal Mind & Language.

== Bibliography ==
- Mind and Language (1975), ISBN 0-19-824521-1 (ed.)
- The Languages of Logic: An Introduction to Formal Logic (1986), ISBN 0-631-14624-5; 2nd ed. (1997), ISBN 1-55786-988-X
- A Companion to the Philosophy of Mind (1994), ISBN 0-631-17953-4 (ed.)
- Mind's Landscape: An Introduction to the Philosophy of Mind (2000), ISBN 0-631-20217-X
- Reading Philosophy: Selected Texts with a Method for Beginners (2002), ISBN 0-631-23437-3 (with Jennifer Hornsby and Christopher Janaway)
- Objects of Metaphor (2005), ISBN 0-19-928088-6
- Reading Ethics (2008), ISBN 978-1-4051-2474-4 (with Miranda Fricker)
