= Thomas Loveday (university administrator) =

Vice Chancellor of the University of Bristol
- In office 1922 – 1944
- Preceded by: E F Francis
- Succeeded by: Professor Arthur Mannering Tyndall FRS

Principal of Southampton University College
- In office 1920 – 1922
- Preceded by: Alexander Hill
- Succeeded by: Kenneth Hotham Vickers

Personal details
- Born: Thomas Tudor Loveday; 15 August 1875 Cropredy, Oxfordshire, England
- Died: 4 March 1966 (aged 90) Williamscot, Oxfordshire, England
- Spouse: Mildred Fowle (died 1958)
- Relations: John Arbuthnott, 8th Viscount of Arbuthnott (great-grandfather); John Loveday (great-great-grandfather)
- Children: 2
- Education: Fettes College
- Alma mater: Magdalen College, Oxford (MA)
- Occupation: Academic

Thomas Tudor Loveday (15 August 1875 – 4 March 1966) was an English academic who was Principal of Southampton University College (1920–22) and later Vice Chancellor of the University of Bristol (1922-1944).

== Early life ==
Loveday was born in Cropredy, Oxfordshire, the son of John Edward Taylor Loveday, a landowner, and Margaret Cheape of Scotland, the granddaughter of John Arbuthnott, 8th Viscount of Arbuthnott. His great-great-grandfather was the antiquary John Loveday. He was educated at Fettes College in Edinburgh and later attended Magdalen College, Oxford, where he obtained an MA. He won the John Locke Scholarship in 1900, and worked as an Assistant Lecturer at the University College of Bangor.

In December 1901, he was elected to a Senior Demyship in Magdalen College.

== Career ==
He had been Professor of Philosophy at what was then the South African College in Cape Town, South Africa. He was later at Armstrong College then part of the University of Durham. He took up his position at Southampton at Easter 1920 and emphasized the importance of better buildings for the college. During his short time at Southampton two more halls of residence were built, one for men and one for women. He was Chairman of the Committee of Vice-Chancellors and Principals from 1935 to 1938, Chairman of the Executive Council of the Universities Bureau from 1943 to 1945 and various other committees.

== Personal life ==
He married Mildred Fowle (who died in 1958) and they had two daughters. He died in Williamscot, near Banbury, Oxfordshire.

== See also ==
- List of University of Southampton people

Academic offices
Preceded by Alexander Hill	Principal of Southampton University College; 1920 - 1922	Succeeded by Kenneth Hotham Vickers
Preceded by E F Francis	Vice Chancellor University of Bristol; 1922 - 1944	Succeeded by Professor Arthur Mannering Tyndall FRS
