= Kenneth Mather =

British geneticist and botanist (1911–1990)

Sir Kenneth Mather CBE FRS (22 June 1911 – 20 March 1990) was a British geneticist and botanist. He was elected a Fellow of the Royal Society in 1949, and won its Darwin Medal in 1964. He was the second vice chancellor of the University of Southampton, serving from 1965 to 1971. He was instrumental in persuading the University Grants Committee to establish a new Medical School at the university.

== Early life ==
He was born in Nantwich, Cheshire. His father, Richard Mather, was a furniture-maker in Nantwich, but originally came from Yorkshire.

In 1915 he attended the Church of England boys' elementary school in Nantwich. He won a county scholarship in 1922 to Nantwich and Acton grammar school. In 1928 he won a county university scholarship to read botany at Manchester University gaining a BSc with first-class honours in 1931. He then gained research scholarship from the Ministry of Agriculture and Fisheries working at the John Innes Horticultural Institution in Merton Park, Surrey, on chromosome behaviour. In 1933 he gained a London University PhD.

== Career ==
In 1933 he worked in Sweden, returning in 1934 to University College London to work under Ronald Fisher where he gained experience in statistical analysis. From 1937 to 1938 he went to the US under a Rockefeller scholarship and then returned as head of genetics at the John Innes Institute. In 1948 he became professor of genetics at Birmingham University. In 1965, as vice chancellor at Southampton, he had a difficult time with student unrest but was able to establish a new medical school for the university. He returned to Birmingham as an Hon. Professor and did work there on biometrical genetics until his death.

== Personal life ==
In 1937 Mather married a fellow botanist, Mona Rhodes (died 1987), and they had one son. He was appointed CBE in 1956 and knighted in 1979.

He received honorary degrees from Southampton University (1972), the University of Bath (1975), Manchester University (1980) and the University of Wales (1980).

He became a fellow of the Royal Society in 1949 and was awarded the Weldon medal (Oxford, 1962) and the Darwin medal (Royal Society, 1964). He was president of the Genetical Society of Great Britain (1949–52).

He died at his home in Edgbaston of a heart attack.

== See also ==
- List of University of Southampton people

Academic offices
| Preceded by David Gwilym James | Vice Chancellor of the University of Southampton; 1965–1971 | Succeeded by Laurence Gower |
