= Anna Middleton =

Social scientist

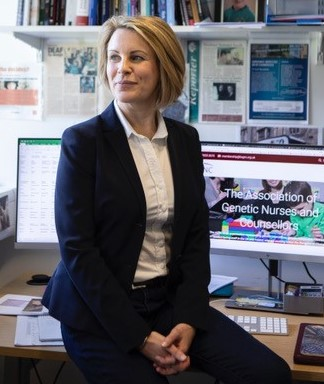
- Anna Middleton in 2019
- Education: University of Leeds (PhD)
- Scientific career
- Workplaces: National Health Service; Wellcome Sanger Institute; Connecting Science; University of Cambridge
- Thesis: Attitudes of deaf adults and hearing parents of deaf children towards issues surrounding genetic testing for deafness (2000)
- Website: societyandethicsresearch.wellcomeconnectingscience.org/staff/anna-middleton

Anna Middleton is a social scientist and genetic counsellor. She is associate director for Engagement and Society within Wellcome Connecting Science, based on the Wellcome Genome Campus. She is also the Director of the Kavli Centre for Ethics, Science, and the Public at the University of Cambridge.

== Education ==
Middleton completed her undergraduate studies in genetics at Newcastle University, before undertaking a MSc in Genetic Counselling at the University of Manchester. She completed a PhD at the School of Psychology and Research School of Medicine at the University of Leeds in 2000. Her PhD is in genetics and psychology, and explored the attitudes of Deaf adults and hearing parents of deaf children towards issues surrounding genetic testing for deafness. Anna was the first person to publish empirical data on the attitudes of Deaf parents towards using pre-natal testing for deafness, with the preference for having deaf children.

Middleton obtained her registration as a Genetic Counsellor with the Genetic Counselling Registration Board UK and Republic of Ireland in 2003.

== Career and research ==
Middleton joined the Sanger Institute in 2010, contributing ethics input into the Deciphering Developmental Disorders project by gathering public perspectives on the return of results from genome sequencing research. In 2015 Anna founded the Society and Ethics Research group, which is part of Wellcome Connecting Science. Anna and the group are interested in a range of issues relating to genomics and its relationship with society. They are undertaking research on public attitudes to genomic data sharing; how to communicate genomic concepts to patients; and the duty of care and the duty of confidentiality in the context of medically relevant genetic information.

Anna acted as an advisor on genomics and ethics to the 2019 Topol Review, an independent report commissioned by the Secretary of State for Health and Social Care on preparing the NHS healthcare workforce for the digital future, including genomics, AI and robotics.

She was Chair of the Oversight Group for Genomics England's 2019 report on 'A Public Dialogue on Genomic Medicine'.

=== Honours and awards ===
Middleton was the Chair of the Association of Genetic Nurses and Counsellors (2018–2019) and vice-chair prior to this, having first been elected to the Committee in 2014. She was also vice-chair of the Genetic Counselling Registration Board (2007–2009) and an elected member of the Board prior to this (2004–2010).

=== Media work ===
Anna has undertaken extensive print and broadcast media work, including appearance on Channel 4 News, BBC Radio 4 and in The Guardian.
