= Robert Stanford Wood =

Sir Robert Stanford Wood KBE CB (5 July 1886 – 18 May 1963) was a civil servant and educational administrator. He was the last Principal of Southampton University College and the first Vice Chancellor of its successor, the University of Southampton, in 1952.

== Early life ==
He was born is Islington, London, the son of a Baptist Minister. He attended the City of London School and then Jesus College, Cambridge, where he took the classical tripos and then historical tripos.

== Career ==
He spent two years at Nottingham High School for Boys. Later he joined the Board of Education in 1911 as a school inspector and later became Principal Private Secretary to the President of the Board of Education, Lord Eustace Percy. He continued in the Civil Service rising through the ranks.and remained in London during the Second World War. Part of his key work was incorporated into the Education Act 1944 working closely with R A Butler who introduced the Act in August 1944. He also developed an initiative that produced 35,000 additional teachers between 1945 and 1951, regarded as a considerable achievement.

By the 1944 act the Board of Education became the Ministry of Education. It was expected that Wood would become permanent secretary, but this did not happen probably due to objections from Ellen Wilkinson, the Labour minister of education. Wood then left the ministry in 1946 succeeding Kenneth Vickers as Principal of Southampton University College. He led the University College to full university status in 1952, becoming its first Vice Chancellor.

Acquisition of new buildings and equipment was a priority made difficult by considerable damage to the port of Southampton during the war. Halls of residence were provided for students and by 1952 student numbers had almost doubled. An institute of education was also established. He worked closely with Lillian Penson, Vice-Chancellor of London University, which awarded external degrees to Southampton students at the time. Wood retired as vice-chancellor but due to age at the end of the 1952 session.

== Personal life ==
In 1922 he married Iris Cecilie and they had a daughter.

He was appointed a Companion of the Order of the Bath (CB) in 1939, and made a Knight Commander of the Order of the British Empire (KBE) in 1941. He died in Kensington, London.

== See also ==
- List of University of Southampton people

Academic offices
Preceded by Kenneth Hotham Vickers	Principal of Southampton University College; 1946-1952 and Vice Chancellor of the University of Southampton; 1952	Succeeded by David Gwilym James
