= Jackie Akhavan =

British chemist; expert in the chemistry of explosives

Jacqueline Akhavan
- Occupations: Chemist; Academic
- Employer: Cranfield University
- Known for: Research into explosives
- Website: www.cranfield.ac.uk/people/professor-jackie-akhavan-776315

Jacqueline Akhavan is a British chemist and expert in the chemistry of explosives.

== Early life and education ==
Akhavan grew up in a house in Bermondsey, South London where there was an outdoor toilet and a tin bath. After graduating, she began working at Pirelli General developing polymeric optical fibers for communication. She worked at Pirelli for 3 years when she went back into academia by joining Cranfield University as a polymer and physical chemistry lecturer. She also received her MPhil in 1982 and her PhD in polymer chemistry from Southampton University.

== Academic career ==
At Cranfield, she first started her work using the explosives in fireworks by understanding the reactions taking place as well as making them safe for the public to use. Eventually, she was promoted to senior lecturer at Cranfield and became the head of the Centre for Defence Chemistry. Her research also is focused on polymer bonded explosives and their applications. During her tenure, she has received numerous research contracts from government organization, such as the Ministry of Defence UK, and also various corporate contracts from companies such as BAe Systems and MBDA. Most of her work, however, is secret due to the nature of her work and the application of her research will never be published. In 2007, she was given a chair in explosive chemistry and is now the Head of the Centre for Defence Chemistry. As of September 2014, her current research is focused on making it easier for government agencies to detect explosives during security screenings like the ones conducted at airports. The main focus of this new research is developing viable ways to detect liquid and paste explosives. Akhavan also helps to train government agencies in bomb recognition and detection to improve safety.

She is both a Fellow of the Royal Society of Chemistry and the Institute of Explosive Engineers. She is also a member of the Board of trustees for the Explosives Engineers Educational and Research Trust, where she helps to promote a safe and professional work environment for employees working with explosives.

== Personal life ==
She highly recommends that people to go into chemistry careers, but also warns them to be ready to stop viewing the world like other people and to accept chemistry as part of their everyday lives. She also advises people looking to go into careers in academia not to expect to be rich. However, she then says that this work provides a strong sense of fulfillment and achievement. As she puts it, it is a way of life.

== Notable Quotes ==
- When asked about the ethics of working with Missiles, Mortars, and IEDs, she said “We don’t make any of those but look at making the explosives inside them safer to manufacture and safer for the user.”
- “A lot of the work we do now is about detecting liquid explosives at airports. It has changed and is [now] all about protecting the people of this country"
- “Your fusing system, you would have a prime explosive in there which, generally speaking, would contain lead azide which is very sensitive. And then your main charge will be a combination of TNT, tri-nitrotoluene, with RDX.”

== The Chemistry of Explosives ==
Akhavan published a book called The Chemistry of Explosives (ISBN 978-1849733304). This book covered many different aspects of explosives including the classification of explosives, combustion, ignition, thermochemistry, and kinetics. Also, there is an introduction to explosives at the beginning of the book that goes over the development of most of the notable explosives used today. The book is meant to teach others about the science behind explosive compounds.

== Notable work ==
Akhavan has led research for:

- United Kingdom Ministry of Defense
- BAE Systems
- Chemring - Provides aerospace, security, and defense products.
- MBDA
- SPEX
- Roxel
- SAFEX
- Pirelli General R&D
- Leonardo da Vinci Eu Programme - To produce a well-trained workforce for all of Europe.
- Head of Center for Defense Chemistry
- Bloodhound - A Project to design a supersonic land vehicle.
