= David Gwilym James =

University administrator (1905–1968)

David Gwilym James (25 September 1905 – 10 December 1968) was the second vice chancellor of the University of Southampton joining in October 1952 and remaining till 1965, the year being marked by university expansion in the United Kingdom following the strong increase in the post-war birth rate in the late 1940s peaking in 1947.

== Early life ==
He was born in Griffithstown, Monmouthshire, Wales. He was educated at West Monmouth School in Pontypool and then attended Aberystwyth University College, University College London and then Trinity College, Cambridge.

== Career ==
He became warden of Merthyr Settlement and then a tutor in Worcester for the University of Birmingham from 1934 to 1937. From 1937 to 1941 he was a lecturer in English at the University College, Cardiff. He was a temporary principal at the Board of Trade in 1941. From 1942 to 1952 he was Winterstoke Professor of English at the University of Bristol. In 1952 he was appointed Vice Chancellor of the University of Southampton.

The university had been the Hartley University College awarding external degrees of the University of London. It had been founded 50 years earlier in 1902, and its origin was as the Hartley Institution formed in 1862. The university college had been granted full university status on 29 April 1952 when Queen Elizabeth II granted it a Royal Charter.

Student numbers in 1952 were about 1,000 with a staff of around 100. By 1963 student numbers had grown to 2,094. During James' tenure, in 1963 the Nuffield Theatre was opened on the main Highfield campus for both visiting and university performers. Also in James' tenure, the Robbins Report was published in 1963. This proposed that the number of students at English universities should rise from 150,000 to 170,000. Southampton set about increasing its students to 4,000, not by 1980 as planned, but by 1967 and James’ last two years as vice-chancellor set about reaching that target.

After Southampton he was a visiting lecturer at several institutions including Yale University from 1965 to 1966.

== Personal life ==
In 1931 he married Dillys Margaret Cledwyn (d. 1965) and they had one son and three daughters. In 1967 he married second Gwynneth Chegwidden. A notable friend of his was J. R. R. Tolkien.

== Publications ==
- Scepticism and Poetry, An Essay on the Poetic Imagination: 1937, reprinted 1980, Greenwood Press ISBN 978-0313228407
- The Romantic Comedy, 1948, OUP, ASIN: B0010WHOVA
- The Life of Reason, The Life of Reason - [The English Augustans] - Hobbes, Locke and Bolingbroke, Pub: Longmans 1949 ASIN: B0006DGLGI
- Wordsworth and Tennyson (Warton Lecture, British Academy, 1950) Reprinted 1982 Haskell House Publishers Inc. ISBN 978-0838300466
- Byron and Shelley (Byron Foundation Lecture, Univ. of Nottingham, 1951) Reprinted 1978, R West, ISBN 978-0849212505
- The Dream of Learning, December 1951, OUP ISBN 978-0198115557
- (Editor) The Universities and the Theatre, 1952
- Matthew Arnold and the Decline of English Romanticism, 1961
- The Dream of Prospero, 1967
- Henry Sidgwick: Science and Faith in Victorian England (Riddell Memorial Lecture) OUP ISBN 978-0197139103

== See also ==
- List of University of Southampton people
- Nuffield Theatre, Southampton

Academic offices
Preceded by Sir Robert Stanford Wood	Vice Chancellor of the University of Southampton; 1952–1965	Succeeded by Sir Kenneth Mather CBE FRS
