= Linda Sutton =

British painter (born 1947)

Linda Sutton (born 1947) is a British painter and president of the Small Paintings Group.

== Biography ==
Sutton was born in 1947 in Southend-on-Sea, Essex. She attended Southend College of Technology then studied at Winchester School of Art. Sutton lived for a year in Antwerp, where Queen Fabiola of Belgium purchased one of her works from her studio at the Antwerp Academy. Sutton then attended the Royal College of Art in London, graduating in 1974.

Her works are often based on mythological themes with an autobiographical perspective and dreamlike quality, such as her work Perseus and Andromeda II. She has also produced works inspired by characters from Italian theatrical works and operas, such as Don Giovanni, Faust, Desdemona, Rosina, and Rusalka. She has also painted portraits of opera singers, such as Romanian soprano Angela Gheorghiu.

Sutton's paintings are held in the collections of the Tate Gallery, the Royal Academy of Arts, and the Sainsbury Collection. She has also been a regular exhibitor at the Royal Academy Summer Exhibition. Sutton has also spent much of her life in Calabria, Italy, and became the first non-Italian artist to hold an exhibition in the Chiesa della Badia.

From 2022, Sutton has been president of the Small Paintings Group.
