= James Castle (sculptor) =

Scottish sculptor and artist

- Born: 1946 (age 79–80); Aberdeen, Scotland
- Education: Ealing School of Art, London; Winchester School of Art, Winchester; Royal College of Art, London
- Known for: Sculpture
- Website: JamesCastleSculpture.co.uk

James Castle is a Scottish sculptor and artist based in Malmesbury, Wiltshire. The majority of his work is carved in wood; there are also sculptures modelled in plaster and clay, some of which have been cast into bronze.

Castle was born in 1946, in Aberdeen, Scotland. He was educated at Ealing School of Art, London; Winchester School of Art, Winchester, where he was taught by Heinz Henghes; and the Royal College of Art, London. He worked as a senior lecturer in sculpture at the University of Gloucestershire, Cheltenham.

A lot of Castle's work depicts loosely, or cryptically anthropomorphic animals. He says: "I think one of the reasons I began to use animals as a metaphor for the human condition came from the fact that we like to bestow these creatures with the same kinds of emotions as our own, without ever really knowing what is going on... this 'one step removed' from our reality is of interest to me."

He was an invited artist at the Royal West of England Academy in 2006. He exhibits with the Compass Gallery, Glasgow, and with the Bohun Gallery, Henley upon Thames.
