= Ian Croudace =

British geochemist, academic

- Born: Trinidad W.I.
- Occupations: Academic, geochemist, researcher and entrepreneur
- Awards: Cecil Barber Prize (Univ. Birmingham), Fellow of Royal Society of Chemistry, FRSC

Academic background
- Education: B.Sc. and Ph.D.
- Alma mater: Liverpool University; Birmingham University
- Thesis: Geochemistry and petrogenesis of the Lower Paleozoic granitoids of North Wales (1980)
- Doctoral advisors: E.D. Lacy and G.L. Hendry

Academic work
- Institutions: Universite de Paris 6 & Le centre CEA Paris-Saclay; Kingston Polytechnic; University of Southampton

Ian Croudace is an English geochemist, academic, researcher and entrepreneur. He is Emeritus Professor of Environmental Radioactivity and Environmental Geochemistry at the University of Southampton and is a Fellow of the Royal Society of Chemistry. Croudace has published over 200 research articles and has supervised 34 PhD projects over his career. He is currently director at Raddec International Limited. He has authored/edited three technical books;Micro-XRF Studies of Sediment Cores: Applications of a non-destructive tool for the environmental sciences , Quaternary International Special Issue entitled "Advances in Data Quantification and Application of High Resolution XRF Core Scanners" and " IAEA TRS495 "Tritium in the Environment". His specialisms include analytical, environmental and isotope geochemistry. His research interests range from Micro-XRF analysis of sediments to Forensic Geochemistry to Radio-analytical developments.

== Education ==
Croudace completed his bachelor's in geology and chemistry in 1973 from Liverpool University and his Ph.D. in granite petrogenesis from Birmingham University in 1980. He undertook an 18 month spell in Paris as a postdoctoral researcher at Université de Paris VI, also known as Pierre et Marie Curie Universite and at Centre d'Etude Nucleaires, Saclay.

== Career ==
Croudace served as an academic at the University of Southampton from 1983 till 2018. He became a professor in 2011. Croudace founded GAU-Radioanalytical Laboratories in 1987, and served as its director until his retirement in 2018 after which he was granted professor emeritus status at the university. Currently, Croudace is director of Raddec International Limited (www.raddec.com).

=== Entrepreneurship ===
Croudace is the inventor of the prototype Itrax micro-XRF sediment core scanner and the Hyperbaric Oxidiser and co-inventor of the Pyrolyser-Trio instrument for the extraction of volatile radionuclides. He was a company co-founder of Raddec International, and remains a senior director.

== Research and work ==
Croudace's main research interests encompass the petrogenesis of granitoid rocks and the application of several analytical tools (X-ray fluorescence analysis, gamma ray spectrometry, radio-analytical chemistry, micro-XRF analysis of sediment, mass spectrometry) to solve problems in environmental geochemistry and nuclear forensics.

Croudace has conducted extensive research on the development and applications of the ITRAX Scanner and XRF Core Scanning techniques. In 2006, he authored a seminal article explaining the features and properties of the ITRAX along with the detailed comparison of data collected with a regular wavelength-dispersive XRF spectrometer. In 2020 Croudace co-authored publications that exploited the power of the ITRAX to undertake high resolution analysis of lake sediment cores which often hold long records of environmental change. In one study, Croudace and co-workers used Double-Spike Lead Isotopes, Radiochronology, and Sediment Microanalysis to study Anthropogenic and Natural Inputs to the largest lake in England (Windermere) that preserved a high-resolution record of pollution. The research indicated a significant concentration increase of elements zinc, copper and lead in sediment around the 1930s and identified the main sources of anthropogenic lead. Its new insights about the pollution history of Windermere could be applied to other lakes with anthropogenic inputs. ITRAX data also contributed a key component of another multi-proxy study of sediment cores from Windermere that provided information on climatic and anthropogenic changes with time and yielded a detailed history of lake and catchment conditions over the past 300 years. In another multi-proxy study, Croudace contributed ITRAX data for lake sediments from Vanuatu, Samoa, and the Southern Cook Islands that hypothesised that the timing and driver for human migration into East Polynesia coincided with a prolonged drought. High resolution variations in ITRAX titanium and other data indicated major catchment disturbances and increases in soil erosion linked to the arrivals of humans. An innovative application of ITRAX core scanners was in water pollution investigations. In this study, a series of ion exchange resin sachets were systematically deployed to monitor changes in heavy metal pollutants entering water courses. Rapid measurement of archived sets of sachets were efficiently made using an ITRAX scanner. The methodology became an environmental forensics tool for wastewater pollution sources.

Croudace's 2015 book entitled "Micro-XRF Studies of Sediment Cores: Applications of a non-destructive tool for the environmental sciences" was reviewed by Wojciech Tylmann from University of Gdańsk. He writes that the book has a "clear structure" and contains "an impressive data set regarding specific applications of micro-XRF core scanners". He further writes that the "content is well illustrated" and that "this book will serve as a priceless source of information for new researchers".

Along with environmental geochemistry research using ITRAX and XRF scanners, Croudace also worked extensively on radionuclide science throughout his career. For example, he conducted an experiment in 1998 that used magnetotactic bacteria to recover radionuclides from wastewater. In 2000, he led a high-profile project that used Mass Spectrometric Measurements of Uranium Isotopes to investigate an alleged nuclear incident at Greenham Common Airbase in 1958. In order to detect the possible contamination from the supposed nuclear incident he studied over 600 soil samples from the Airbase and surrounding areas to determine their Uranium isotopic composition and developed an efficient and precise method of Uranium analysis. Results showed no evidence of anomalous Uranium isotope contamination on the Airbase. However, the detection of anomalous Uranium near the Atomic Weapons Establishment (Aldermaston) served to validate the effectiveness of the research approach used for the environmental survey.

In 1996, Croudace introduced for the first time the application of Lithium Borate Fusion for the ultra-rapid dissolution of soil and other complex samples in radioanalytical chemistry. He also showed the effectiveness of the method as being suitable for sample preparation in nuclear waste characterisation Based on his radioanalytical expertise he was invited to produce a paper to highlight recent contributions to the rapid screening of radionuclides in the field of nuclear forensics and nuclear waste characterisation. Croudace also undertook significant research and development in the extraction of volatile radionuclides (tritium, C-14 etc) from environmental and nuclear materials. This work led to the commercialization of the Raddec Pyrolyser thermal desorption instrument.

== Awards and distinctions ==
- 2015 - Fellow, Royal Society of Chemistry

== Bibliography ==
=== Books ===
- Micro-XRF Studies of Sediment Cores: Applications of a non-destructive tool for the environmental sciences, Springer (2015)
- Advances in Data Quantification and Application of High Resolution XRF Core Scanners, Quaternary International - Exec. Guest Editor. Special Issue: Volume 514, 2019 (Croudace I.W. (Exec Ed.), Lowemark L., Tjallingii R. & Zolitschka B.)
- Tritium in the Environment - TRS495 I.W. Croudace & A. Ulanowski (Editors), 2026, IAEA (Vienna), 9 Chapters, pp362.

=== Selected articles ===
- Croudace IW, Warwick PE, Taylor RN and Dee SJ (1998) Rapid procedure for Pu and U determination in soils using a borate fusion and extraction. chromatography. Analytica Chimica Acta, 371, 217-225.
- Croudace IW. Warwick PE, Taylor RN and Cundy AB (2000) Investigation of an alleged nuclear incident at Greenham Common airbase using mass spectrometric measurements of uranium isotopes. Environmental Science and Technology, 34, 4496-4503.
- Warneke T, Croudace IW, Warwick PE and Taylor RN (2002) First ground-level fallout record of uranium and plutonium isotopes for northern temperate latitudes. Earth Planet Sci. Lett., 203, 1047-1057.
- Croudace IW, Warwick PE, Reading DG, Russell B (2016) Recent contributions to the rapid screening of radionuclides in emergency responses and nuclear forensics. Trends in Analytical Chemistry, 85B, 120-129.
- Croudace IW, Rindby A and Rothwell RG (2006) ITRAX: Description and evaluation of a new sediment core scanner in R.G. Rothwell (ed.) New techniques in sediment core analysis. Geol. Soc. Spec. Publ., 267, 51-63.
- Croudace, IW, Löwemark, L, Tjallingii, R, Zolitschka, B (2019). Current perspectives on the capabilities of high resolution XRF core scanners. Quaternary International, 514, 5-15
- Fielding JJ, Croudace IW, Kemp AES, Pearce RB, Cotterill CJ, Langdon P, Avery R (2020) Tracing lake pollution, eutrophication and partial recovery from the sediments of Windermere, UK, using geochemistry and sediment microfabrics. Science of the Total Environment, 722, 1-20.
- Sear DA, Allen MS, Hassall JD, Maloney AE, Langdon PG, Morrison AE, Henderson ACG, Mackay H, Croudace IW, Clarke C, Sachs JP, Macdonald G, Chiverrell RC, Leng MJ, Cisneros-Dozal, LM and Fonville T (2020) Human settlement of East Polynesia earlier, incremental, and coincident with prolonged South Pacific drought. PNAS, 117, 8813–8819.
- Huang JS, Lin S, Löwemark L, Liou S YH, Chang T-K, Wei K-Y and Croudace IW (2019) Rapid assessment of heavy metal pollution using ion-exchange resin sachets and micro-XRF core-scanning. Sci Rep 9, 6601.
- Warwick PE, Kim D, Croudace IW and Oh J (2010) Effective desorption of tritium from diverse solid matrices and its application to routine analysis of decommissioning materials. Analytica Chimica Acta, 676, 93–102.
- Croudace IW, Warwick PE and Morris JE (2012) Evidence for the Preservation of Technogenic Tritiated Organic Compounds in an Estuarine Sedimentary Environment. Environ. Sci. Technol., 46, 5704–5712.
- Kim D, Croudace IW and Warwick PE (2012) The requirement for proper storage of nuclear and related decommissioning samples to safeguard accuracy of tritium data. J. Hazardous Materials, 213-214, 292–298.
- Croudace IW, Warwick PE & Kim D-J (2014). Using Thermal Evolution Profiles to Infer Tritium Speciation in Nuclear Site Metals: An Aid to Decommissioning. Analytical Chemistry, 86, 9177–9185.
- Croudace IW, Warwick PE and Marsh R (2016) A suite of robust radioanalytical techniques for the determination of tritium and other volatile radionuclides in decommissioning wastes and environmental matrices. Fusion Sci. Technol., 71, 290-295.
