= Kairbaan Hodivala-Dilke =

Cell biologist

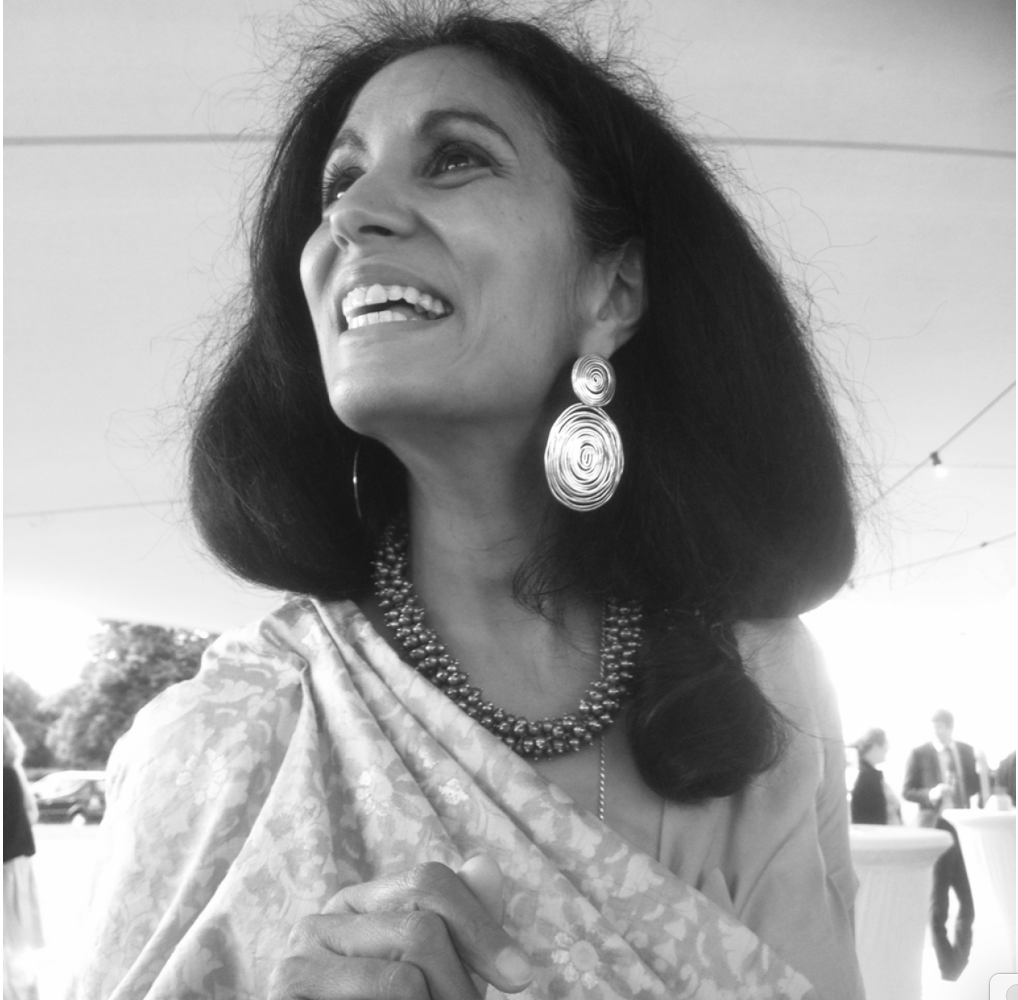
- Education: University of Southampton; Imperial Cancer Research Fund
- Known for: Study of Angiogenesis
- Scientific career
- Fields: Cell Biology
- Workplaces: Barts and The London School of Medicine and Dentistry

Kairbaan Hodivala-Dilke, FMedSci is an English cell biologist who has made significant contributions to the understanding of the cellular and molecular biology of the tumour microenvironment and in particular angiogenesis. She is Professor of Angiogenesis and the Tumour Microenvironment and Deputy Institute Director of Barts Cancer Institute, Queen Mary University of London. In 2015 she was awarded the Hooke medal from the British Society for Cell Biology and EMBO membership.

== Early life ==
Hodivala-Dilke was born to an Indian Parsi family in South West London.

== Education and academic career ==
Hodivala-Dilke's scientific career started as a technical assistant, first at The Jodrell Laboratories, Kew Gardens, and later in the Wellcome Trust funded Malaria Research team at Imperial College, London. Following a BSc in Biology at the University of Southampton, Hodivala-Dilke studied for a PhD in epithelial cell biology with Fiona Watt at Imperial Cancer Research Fund (now part of the Francis Crick Institute) in London. Hodivala-Dilke then moved to The Massachusetts Institute of Technology, for a postdoctoral fellowship with Richard Hynes.

Hodivala-Dilke returned to the UK as an Imperial Cancer Research Fund tenure-track fellow, mentored by Professor Ian Hart, first at St. Thomas’ Hospital and later at Barts Cancer Institute. In 2004 Hodivala-Dilke was awarded tenure and in 2009 became Professor of Angiogenesis. Hodivala-Dilke became deputy director of the Barts Cancer Institute in 2012.

== Research interests ==
During her studies at The Massachusetts Institute of Technology, Hodivala-Dilke studied adhesion molecules called integrins and her findings support that epidermal α3β1 integrin is required for the prevention of blistering diseases and that αvβ3-integrin is required for blood clotting. Subsequently, her research interests have been directed to revealing the role that adhesion related molecules have in blood vessel formation (angiogenesis). Her finding that αvβ3-integrin acts as a negative regulator of pathological angiogenesis rather than promoting the growth of new blood vessels, highlighted the requirement for more investigation of how α_{v}-integrin antagonists act in anti-angiogenic treatments.

Studies of a mouse model of Down syndrome have found that 3 copies of some chromosome 21 genes can impede the growth of blood vessels in tumours. These mice provide a system to discover new regulators of blood vessel growth. Recent investigations have increased understanding of the role that stromal focal adhesion kinase (FAK) plays in tumour growth, progression and resistance to chemotherapy. Hodivala-Dilke's research goal is to study how the tumour microenvironment can control tumour progression and cancer treatment efficacy.

Hodivala-Dilke's team at Barts Cancer Institute have established the role of stromal focal adhesion kinase (FAK) in chemoresistance. The team have pioneered a novel concept in vascular promotion using low doses of RGD mimetics in enhancing the efficacy of cancer therapy. The team's overall goal is to discover novel therapeutic vascular targets to modulate stromal control in the control of cancer.

== Professional associations and awards ==
- In 2015, Hodivala-Dilke was awarded EMBO membership.
- In 2015, Hodivala-Dilke was awarded the Hooke medal from the British Society for Cell Biology.
- In 2015, Hodivala-Dilke was elected a fellow of the Academy of Medical Sciences.
