= Christopher Janaway =

Philosopher and author

Christopher Janaway is a philosopher and author. He earned degrees from the University of Oxford. Before moving to Southampton in 2005, Janaway taught at the University of Sydney and Birkbeck, University of London. His recent research has been on Arthur Schopenhauer, Friedrich Nietzsche and aesthetics. His 2007 book Beyond Selflessness: Reading Nietzsche's Genealogy focuses on a critical examination of Nietzsche's On the Genealogy of Morals. Janaway currently lectures at the University of Southampton.

== Publications ==
=== Monographs ===
- Beyond Selflessness: Reading Nietzsche's Genealogy (Oxford University Press, 2007), ISBN 0-19-927969-1
- Reading Aesthetics and Philosophy of Art: Selected Texts with Interactive Commentary (Blackwell, 2005), ISBN 1-4051-1807-5
- Reading Philosophy (Blackwell, 2002), ISBN 0-631-23437-3 (with Samuel Guttenplan and Jennifer Hornsby)
- Schopenhauer: A Very Short Introduction (Oxford University Press, 2002), ISBN 0-19-280259-3
- Images of Excellence: Plato's Critique of the Arts (Clarendon Press, 1995), ISBN 0-19-824007-4
- Schopenhauer (Oxford University Press, 1994), ISBN 0-19-287685-6
- Self and World in Schopenhauer's Philosophy (Clarendon Press, 1989), ISBN 0-19-824969-1

=== Edited collections ===
- The Cambridge Companion to Schopenhauer (Cambridge University Press, 1999), ISBN 0-521-62106-2
- Willing and Nothingness: Schopenhauer as Nietzsche's Educator (Clarendon Press, 1998), ISBN 0-19-823590-9

=== Articles and chapters ===
- ‘Guilt, Bad Consciencia, and Self-punishment in Nietzsche’s Genealogy’, in Brian Leiter and Neil Sinhababu (eds.), Nietzsche and Morality (Oxford University Press, 2008).
- ‘Plato and the Arts’ in Hugh Benson (ed.), The Blackwell Companion to Plato (Blackwell, forthcoming).
- ‘Nietzsche on Free Will, Autonomy and the Sovereign Individual’, Proceedings of the Aristotelian Society, Supplementary Volume (2006).
- ‘Naturalism and Genealogy’, in Keith Ansell-Pearson (ed.), A Companion to Nietzsche (Oxford: Blackwell, 2006), 337–352.
- ‘Schopenhauer et la Valeur du “Non Égoïste”’, in Christian Bonnet and Jean Salem (eds.), La Raison Dévoilée: Études Schopenhaueriennes (Paris: J. Vrin, 2005), 81–94.
- ‘Disinterestedness and Objectivity: Nietzsche on Schopenhauer and Kant’, Studia Kantiana (São Paulo: Brazilian Kant Society, 2003).
- ‘Schopenhauer as Nietzsche’s Educator’, in Nicholas Martin (ed.), Nietzsche and the German Tradition (Oxford/Bern: Peter Lang, 2003), 155–185.
- ‘Schopenhauer and Nietzsche: Is the Will Merely a Word?’, in Thomas Pink and M.W.F. Stone (eds.), The Will and Human Action from Antiquity to the Present Day (London Studies in the History of Philosophy, 4; London: Routledge, 2003), 172–196.
- ‘Tragedy: a Case of Pleasure in Pain’, in Arto Haapala and Oiva Kuisma (eds.), Aesthetic Experience and the Moral Dimension: Essays on Moral Problems in Aesthetics (Helsinki: Acta Philosophica Fennica 72, 2003), 19–32.
- ‘Nietzsche’s Artistic Revaluation’, in Sebastian Gardner and José Luis Bermúdez (eds.), Art and Morality (London: Routledge, 2003), 260–276.
- ‘Plato’ in Berys Gaut and Dominic McIver Lopes (eds.), The Routledge Companion to Aesthetics (London and New York: Routledge, 2001), 3–13 (Reprinted in 2nd edition 2005).
- ‘Arthur Schopenhauer’, in Steven M. Emmanuel (ed.), The Blackwell Guide to Modern Philosophers: From Descartes to Nietzsche (Malden, MA/Oxford: Blackwell, 2001), 326–342.
- ‘Schopenhauer’s Pessimism’, in Anthony O’Hear (ed.), German Philosophy Since Kant (Royal Institute of Philosophy Supplement 44; Cambridge: Cambridge University Press, 1999), 47–63.
- ‘What a Musical Forgery Isn’t’, British Journal of Aesthetics 39 (1999), 62–71.
- ‘Schopenhauer’s Pessimism’, in C. Janaway (ed.), The Cambridge Companion to Schopenhauer (Cambridge: Cambridge University Press, 1999), 318–343.
- ‘Will and Nature’, in C. Janaway (ed.), The Cambridge Companion to Schopenhauer (Cambridge: Cambridge University Press, 1999), 138–170.
- ‘Schopenhauer as Nietzsche’s Educator’, in C. Janaway (ed.), Willing and Nothingness: Schopenhauer as Nietzsche’s Educator (Oxford: Oxford University Press, 1998), 13–36.
- ‘Nietzsche’s Illustration of the Art of Exegesis’, European Journal of Philosophy 5 (1997), 251–268.
- ‘Kant’s Aesthetics and the “Empty Cognitive Stock”’, Philosophical Quarterly 47 (1997), 459–476.
- ‘Two Kinds of Artistic Duplication’, British Journal of Aesthetics 37 (1997), 1–14.
- ‘Aesthetic Autonomies: A Discussion of Paul Guyer, Kant and the Experience of Freedom’, in Kantian Review 1 (1997), 151–161.
- ‘Knowledge and Tranquility: Schopenhauer on the Value of Art’, in Dale Jacquette (ed.), Schopenhauer, Philosophy and the Arts (Cambridge: Cambridge University Press, 1996), 39–61.
- ‘Greek Philosophy I: The Pre-Socratics and Plato’, in A. C. Grayling (ed.), Philosophy: a guide through the subject (Oxford: Oxford University Press, 1995), 336–397.
- ‘Beauty in Nature, Beauty in Art’, British Journal of Aesthetics 33 (1993), 321–332.
- ‘Arts and Crafts in Plato and Collingwood’, Journal of Aesthetics and Art Criticism 50 (1992), 45–54.
- ‘Borges and Danto: A Reply to Michael Wreen’, British Journal of Aesthetics 32 (1992), 72–76.
- ‘Craft and Fineness in Plato’s Ion’, Oxford Studies in Ancient Philosophy 10 (1992), 1–23.
- ‘Nietzsche, the Self and Schopenhauer’, in Keith Ansell-Pearson (ed.), Nietzsche and Modern German Thought (London: Routledge, 1991), 119–142.
- ‘Plato’s Analogy between Painter and Poet’, British Journal of Aesthetics 31 (1991), 1–12.
- ‘Knowing about Surprises: A Supposed Antinomy Revisited’, Mind 98 (1989), 391–409.
- ‘Recent Work in Aesthetics’, Philosophical Books 30 (1989), 193–201.
- ‘History of Philosophy: The Analytical Ideal’, Aristotelian Society Supplementary Volume 62 (1988), 169–189.
- ‘The Subject and the Objective Order’, Proceedings of the Aristotelian Society 84 (1983–1984), 147–165.
- ‘Wittgenstein on the Willing Subject and the Thinking Subject’, in Language, Logic and Philosophy: Proceedings of 4th International Wittgenstein Symposium (1979), 520–522.

=== Entries in works of reference ===
- ‘Schopenhauer, Arthur’, in Europe 1789–1914 (Scribner’s, forthcoming)
- ‘Aesthetics, history of’, in Ted Honderich (ed.), The Oxford Companion to Philosophy (2nd edn.) (Oxford: Oxford University Press, 2005), 9–12.
- ‘Schopenhauer, Arthur’, in Concise Routledge Encyclopedia of Philosophy (London and New York: Routledge, 2000), 801–802.
- ‘Plato’, in Michael Kelly (ed.), Encyclopaedia of Aesthetics (Oxford: Oxford University Press, 1998), vol. 3, 518–521.
- ‘Schopenhauer, Arthur’, in Edward Craig (ed.), Encyclopaedia of Philosophy (London: Routledge, 1998), 545–554.
- ‘Aesthetic Attitude’, ‘Aesthetic Distance’, ‘Aesthetic Judgement’, ‘Aestheticism’, ‘Aesthetics, Problems of’, ‘Art’, ‘Art Criticism’, ‘Beauty’, ‘Death-of-the-Author Thesis’, ‘Fiction’, ‘Forgery’, ‘Imagination, Aesthetic’, ‘Intentional Fallacy’, ‘Representation in Art’, ‘Scruton, Roger’, ‘Tragedy’, ‘Value, Aesthetic’, in Ted Honderich (ed.), The Oxford Companion to Philosophy (Oxford: Oxford University Press,1995), 8–9, 13–17, 58–59, 60, 80–81, 178, 279, 284, 395–396, 412, 770, 816, 878, 895.

=== Study materials ===
- [With Samuel Guttenplan and Jennifer Hornsby] Introduction to Philosophy (University of London External Programme; London, 2000).
- [With Hugh Lawson-Tancred] Ancient Greek Philosophy (University of London External Programme; London, 1994).

=== Translations into English ===
- The World as Will and Representation (2 volumes) by Arthur Schopenhauer (with Judith Norman and Alistair Welchman - Cambridge University Press, 2010 and 2018)
- Friedrich Nietzsche, 'On Schopenhauer: Notes 1868’, in C. Janaway (ed.), Willing and Nothingness: Schopenhauer as Nietzsche’s Educator (Oxford, Oxford University Press, 1998), 258–265.
- Peter Bieri, ‘Nominalism and Inner Experience’, The Monist 65 (1982), 68–87.

=== Reviews ===
- [With Ken Gemes] 'Naturalism and Value in Nietzsche: a Review of Brian Leiter, Nietzsche on Morality’, in Philosophy and Phenomenological Research (forthcoming).
- Friedrich Nietzsche, The Gay Science: With a Prelude in German Rhymes and an Appendix of Songs, ed. Bernard Williams, trans. Josefine Nauckhoff, poems trans. AdrianDel Caro, in Notre Dame Philosophical Reviews (on-line publication, 2002).
- Aaron Ridley, Music, Value and the Passions, in British Journal of Aesthetics 39 (1999), 198–200.
- John E. Atwell, Schopenhauer on the Character of the World: The Metaphysics of Will, in Philosophical Quarterly 48 (1998), 274–277.
- Nicholas Martin, Nietzsche and Schiller: Untimely Aesthetics, in British Journal of Aesthetics 37 (1997), 92–94.
- John E. Atwell, Schopenhauer on the Character of the World: The Metaphysics of Will, in Times Literary Supplement, 27 December 1996, 27.
- T. J. Diffey, The Republic of Art and Other Essays, in The Philosophical Quarterly 43 (1993), 250–251.
- Julian Young, Willing and Unwilling: A Study in the Philosophy of Arthur Schopenhauer in International Studies in Philosophy 24 (1992), 151–152.
- Howard Caygill, Art of Judgement, in Philosophical Books 32 (1991), 186–187.
- Ernst Tugendhat, Self-consciousness and Self-determination (trans. Paul Stern), in Times Literary Supplement, 27 February 1987, 222.
- Sean Sayers, Reason and Reality: Dialectic and the Theory of Knowledge, in Times Literary Supplement, 4 April 1986, 367.
- Karl Ameriks, Kant’s Theory of Mind: An Analysis of the Paralogisms of Pure Reason, in Mind 93 (1984), 632–634.
- Joseph Margolis, Art and Philosophy: Conceptual Issues in Aesthetics, in Mind 93 (1984), 294–296.
- Bryan Magee, The Philosophy of Schopenhauer, in Mind 93 (1984), 608–610.
- Julia Annas, An Introduction to Plato’s Republic, in Times Literary Supplement, 21 May 1982, 565.
