= SPEX (astronomy) =

The SPEX (Spectropolarimeter for Planetary Exploration) is a single-channel, high-precision polarimeter for the characterization of planetary atmospheres. It is intended for planetary science missions, but it could, with minor modifications, also be used for Earth observation by a microsatellite, such as the Dutch FAST-D project.
