= Miron Livny =

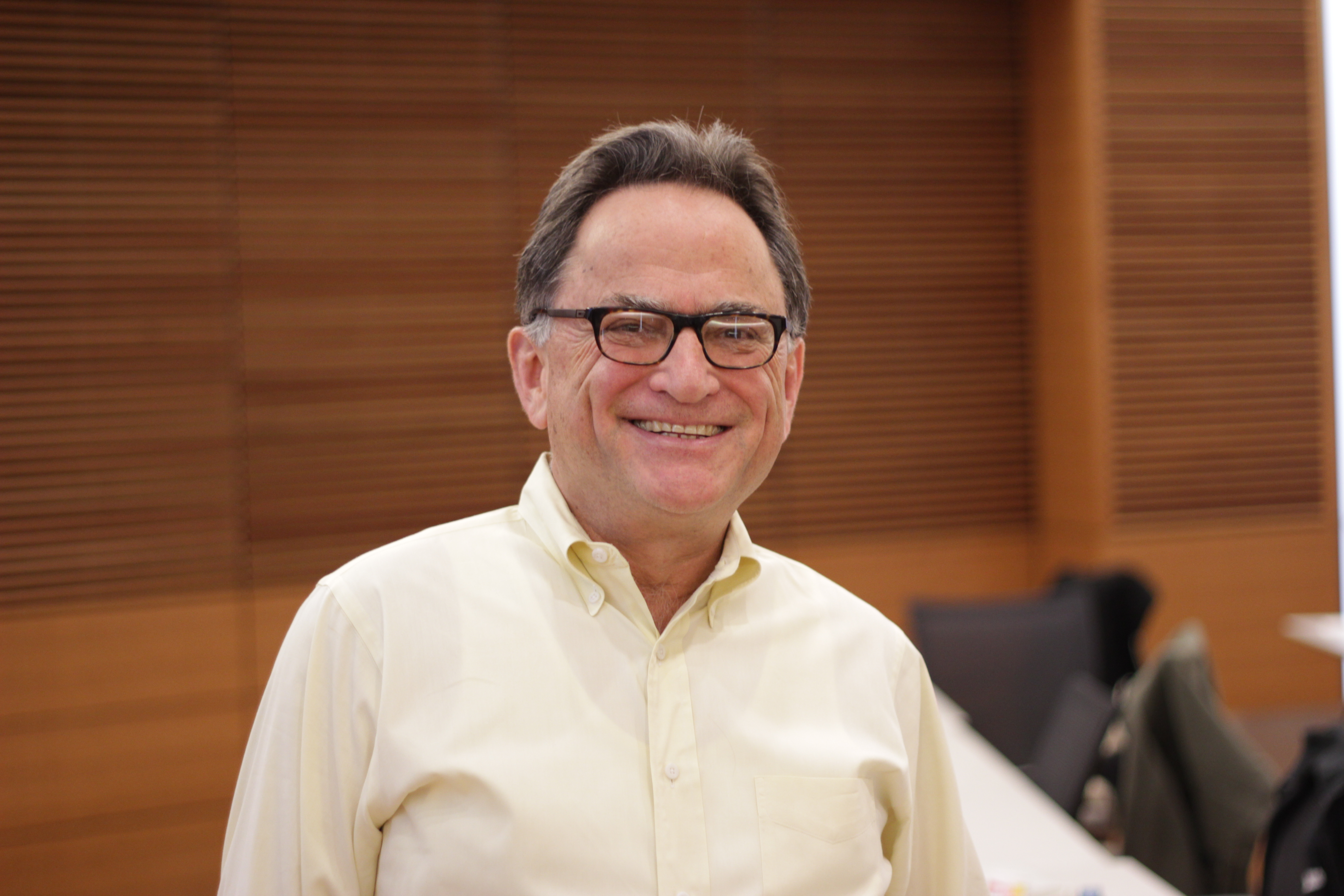
- Born: May 1, 1950 (age 76)
- Education: Weizmann Institute of Science
- Known for: HTCondor
- Scientific career
- Fields: Computer Science
- Workplaces: University of Wisconsin–Madison
- Website: http://pages.cs.wisc.edu/~miron/

Miron Livny (Hebrew: מירון לבני) is a senior researcher and professor specializing in distributed computing at the University of Wisconsin–Madison. Livny has been a professor of computer science at Wisconsin since 1983, where he leads the HTCondor high-throughput computing system project. Miron is also a principal investigator and currently the facility coordinator for the Open Science Grid project, Director of the Center for High Throughput computing, CTO of Wisconsin Institutes for Discovery, and Director of Core Computational Technology of the Morgridge Institute for Research.

In 2006, along with Raghu Ramakrishnan, Professor Livny won the SIGMOD Test of Time award for his seminal work on distributed databases.

== Education ==
- Ph.D., Computer Science, August 1983. Weizmann Institute of Science. (Thesis: The Study of Load Balancing Algorithms for Decentralized Processing Systems)
- M.S., Computer Science, 1978. Weizmann Institute of Science.
- B.S., Physics and Mathematics, 1975. Hebrew University.
