= Heinz Henghes =

British sculptor (1906–1975)

Heinz Henghes in 1974.

Heinz Henghes (20 August 1906 – 20 December 1975) was a British sculptor.

Born Gustav Heinrich Clusmann in Hamburg (Germany). At the age of 17, Henghes ran away from home to go to the United States. In New York City he met a number of artists and writers and was influenced by Isamu Noguchi. In 1932, after eight years in America, Henghes travelled to France and lived for a short time in Paris where he met Constantin Brâncuși. In 1933 he went on to Rapallo in Italy where he enjoyed the patronage of Ezra Pound, who helped him by providing materials and space to work. For the next four years, Henghes was based in Italy, holding a number of exhibitions and building his reputation as a sculptor.

In 1937, following a further interlude in Paris, Henghes moved to England and set up his studio in London. By the time of the outbreak of war he had exhibited in various venues including the Guggenheim Jeune Gallery in Cork Street. Still a German national, Henghes was sent on the notorious ship the HMT Dunera to Australia where he was briefly interned in 1940 at Camp Hay. In 1941 he returned to England and for much of the war did freelance writing on current affairs for the BBC. His talks were broadcast on Radio Newsreel, on the Latin American Service, on the Italian Programme and other services in a variety of languages.

One man and group shows increased after the war and, whilst a lecturer in sculpture at the Royal College of Art in London, Henghes participated in the 1951 Festival of Britain. During this period he also broadcast on art and became a naturalised British citizen.

In 1953 Henghes moved to the Dordogne region of France where he was drawn by the discovery of Lascaux. In 1964 he returned to England to take up the post of Head of Fine Art at Winchester School of Art. He retired again to France in 1973. He died in Bordeaux in 1975.

Henghes is particularly noted for his finely polished white marble torsos, but he moved with the times, always living for the present, and worked in a range of materials and styles.
