= Anna Murray (scientist) =

British biologist and academic

- Education: University of Southampton
- Scientific career
- Workplaces: University of Exeter
- Thesis: T cell clonality in coeliac disease and enteropathy associated T cell lymphoma (1994)

Anna Murray is a British biologist who is Professor of Human Genetics at the University of Exeter. Her research focuses on the genetics underlying the reproductive ageing of women, including the timing of menopause.

== Early life and education ==
Murray studied biology at the University of Southampton. She remained there for her doctoral research, investigating the coeliac disease and T-cell lymphoma. Murray moved to the Wessex Regional Genetics Laboratory, where she worked with Patricia Jacobs on Fragile X syndrome. Her work on the association of premature ovarian failure with fragile X syndrome led her to working on the genetics of reproductive ageing. Murray was supported was supported by a Career Development Fellowship from the Wellcome Trust to explore how fragile X impacted ovarian health.

== Research and career ==
Murray was appointed a lecturer at the University of Exeter in 2008. She was promoted to professor in 2022 and leads the Reproductive Genomics group at the University of Exeter Medical School. Her main expertise is in the field of reproductive ageing. She leads genome-wide approaches to identify the genetic basis of reproductive ageing, including menopause timing, premature ovarian insufficiency, and related reproductive traits.

Early in her career, Murray found that around 2% of women with primary ovarian insufficiency carry mutations in the FMR1 gene. This makes FMR1 the most common known genetic cause of the condition, and suggests FMR1 testing can be used to diagnose primary ovarian insufficiency and early menopause.

Murray led early efforts to use genome-wide approaches to study reproductive ageing as a complex trait. Such studies were made possible by the formation of the ReproGen international consortium. Since 2012, she has led genome-wide studies that have significantly advanced understanding of the common genetic basis of reproductive ageing.

In 2024 Murray led a study investigating the contribution of rare coding genetic variants to ovarian ageing in more than 100,000 women in the UK Biobank. She identified that DNA damage repair is a key biological pathway, suggesting potential treatments for early menopause, and links between reproductive lifespan, cancer susceptibility and germline mutation processes.

In 2024, Murray was awarded a £5.6m Wellcome Discovery Award to advance understanding of the biological mechanisms behind ovarian development, reproductive ageing and ovarian diseases.

== Academic service ==
Murray set up the University of Exeter MSc Genomic Medicine programme in 2016.

== Selected publications ==
- Katherine S. Ruth; Felix R. Day; Jazib Hussain; et al. (4 August 2021). "Genetic insights into biological mechanisms governing human ovarian ageing". Nature. 596 (7872): 393–397. Bibcode:2021Natur.596..393R. doi:10.1038/s41586-021-03779-7. ISSN 1476-4687. PMC 7611832. PMID 34349265. Wikidata Q108609948.
- Katherine S Ruth; Felix R. Day; Jessica Tyrrell; et al. (10 February 2020). "Using human genetics to understand the disease impacts of testosterone in men and women". Nature medicine. 26 (2): 252–258. doi:10.1038/s41591-020-0751-5. ISSN 1078-8956. PMC 7025895. PMID 32042192. Wikidata Q89637984.
- Stasa Stankovic; Saleh Shekari; Qin Qin Huang; et al. (September 2024). "Genetic links between ovarian ageing, cancer risk and de novo mutation rates". Nature. 633 (8030): 608–614. doi:10.1038/s41586-024-07931-x. ISSN 1476-4687. PMC 11410666. PMID 39261734. Wikidata Q140800989.
