= Beyond Selflessness =

Book by Christopher Janaway

Beyond Selflessness: Reading Nietzsche's Genealogy
- Author: Christopher Janaway
- Language: English
- Subject: Friedrich Nietzsche
- Publisher: Oxford University Press
- Publication date: 2007
- Media type: Print (hardcover and paperback)
- Pages: 296
- ISBN: 978-0199570850

Beyond Selflessness: Reading Nietzsche's Genealogy is a philosophical examination of the work of Friedrich Nietzsche in On the Genealogy of Morality (1887). The monograph was released by Christopher Janaway in 2007 as part of his series examining the work of Nietzsche.

== Critical reception ==
Paul Bishop believed Janaway dealt well with the Nazism roots present in Nietzsche's philosophy, although this as a premise to his work is often debated. Paul Katsafanas believed that: "It is an exceptionally clear work, full of valuable insights, helpful reconstructions of arguments, and intriguing readings of some of Nietzsche’s most important claims." Katsafanas did raise some issues on the intrinsic details of Janaway's claims, including the tension between self-affirmation and self-satisfaction, although concluded: "Although I have expressed concerns about the details of some of Janaway's arguments, the book as a whole is exceptionally rewarding".
