= Linda Luxon =

British researcher (1948–2023)

Linda Luxon (13 April 1948 – 2 September 2023) was British professor of audiovestibular medicine at University College London and the first female treasurer of the Royal College of Physicians (RCP).
