= Winchester School of Art =

Art school of the University of Southampton

Coordinates: 51.066°N 1.309°W

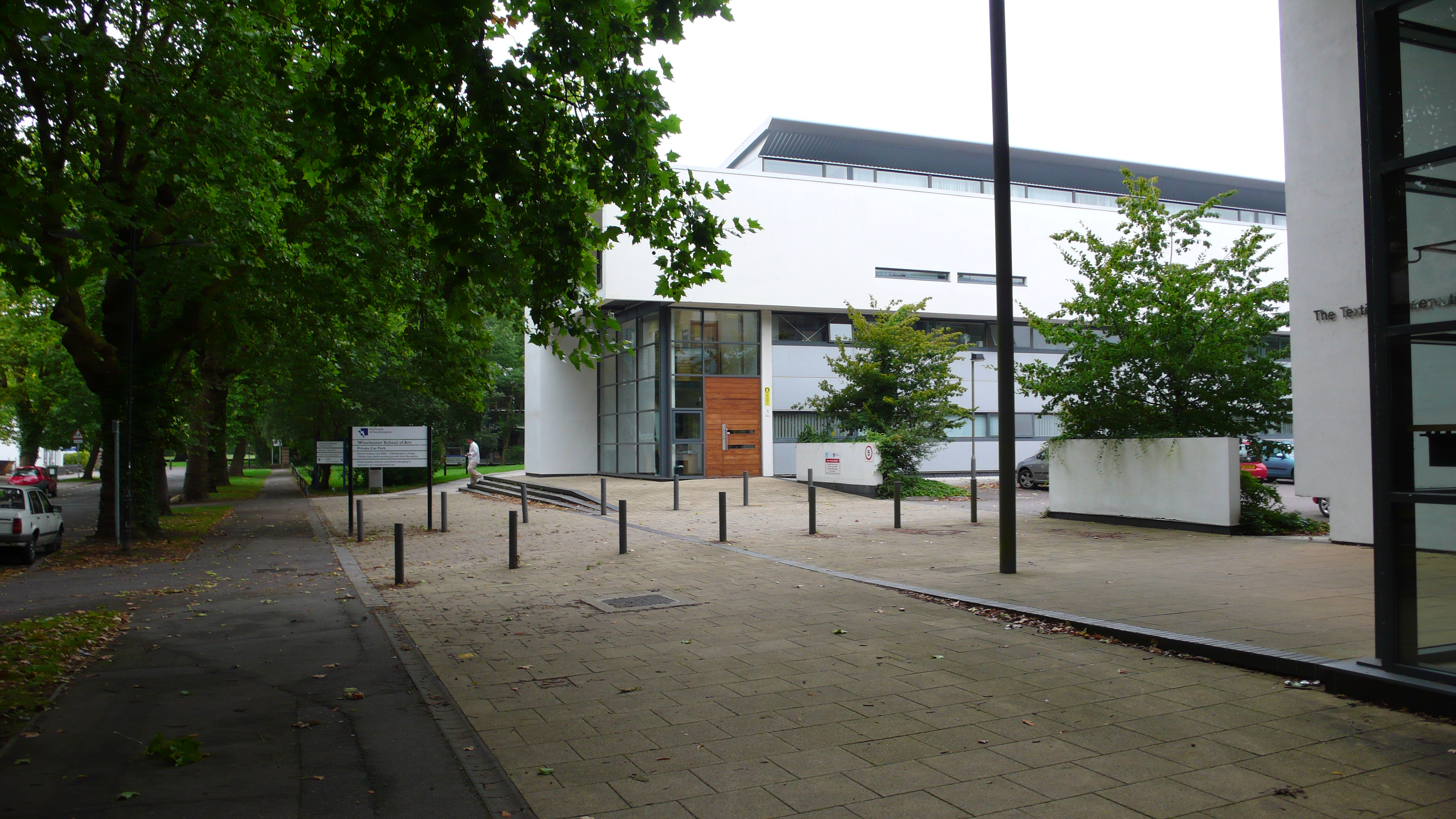
Administration building

Winchester School of Art is the art school of the University of Southampton, situated 10 miles (14 km) north of Southampton in the city of Winchester near the south coast of England.

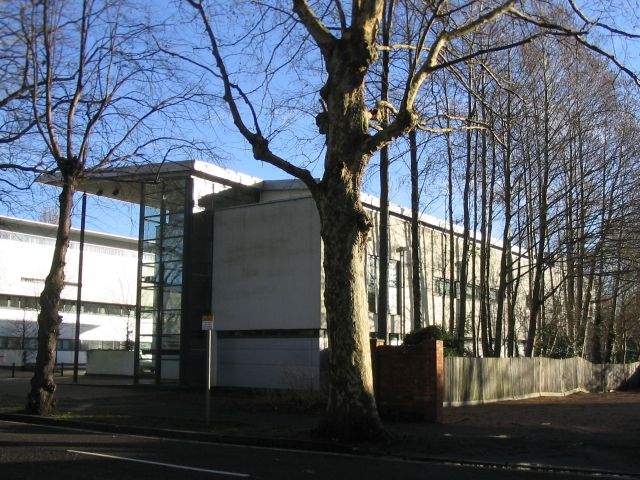
South Building

== History ==
Winchester School of Art (WSA) was founded in 1870, and originally occupied Winchester's twelfth-century Wolvesey Castle. In 1895 it moved to new premises in the Kings Court wing of Winchester Guildhall. In 1962 it was granted new buildings, which it still occupies. In 1996, the School merged with the University of Southampton.

== Faculty, departments and subjects ==
Winchester School of Art is part of the Faculty of Arts and Humanities and has three Departments. The Department of Art and Media Technology includes education, enterprise and research in Games Design, Fine Art, Curation, Leadership, Media Arts, Creative Computing and Technologies. The Department of Fashion and Textiles includes education, enterprise and research Fashion Design, Textile Design, Fashion Management and Luxuray Brand Management. The Department of Design includes education, enterprise and research in Graphic Communication, Advertising, Branding and Design.

== Textile Conservation Centre ==
The Textile Conservation Centre was a specialist centre for research and training founded in 1975 by Karen Finch at Hampton Court Palace. Between 1998 and 2009 the centre was merged with the University of Southampton and housed from 1999 in a purpose-designed building at the Winchester School of Art. In April 2009, it was announced that the University of Southampton had decided to close the Textile Conservation Centre on 31 October 2009, prompting widespread concern from academics and historians. The programme is now part of the Kelvin Centre for Conservation and Cultural Heritage Research (former Centre for Textile Conservation) at the University of Glasgow, where it opened in autumn 2010.

== Notable alumni ==
- Darren Almond, artist
- Lauren Aston, businesswoman
- John Buckley, sculptor
- James Castle, sculptor
- Stephen Chambers, artist
- Diana Copperwhite, painter
- Brian Eno, musician, record producer, visual artist and theorist
- Mary Fairburn, artist
- Greg Gilbert, musician (frontman of indie rock band Delays), visual artist, poet
- Jasmine Guinness, studied printmaking, became a model
- Emma Hartley, painter
- Paul Lee, artist
- Margaret Graeme Niven, painter.
- Mick O'Dea, artist
- Katie Pratt, artist
- Geoffrey Richardson, musician
- Linda Sutton, painter
- Stella Tennant, studied sculpture, became a model
