= Shanaka L de Silva =

British-American geologist

- Occupations: Geologist, academic and author

Academic background
- Education: BSc (Hons)., Geology; PhD., Earth Sciences
- Alma mater: University of Southampton; Open University

Academic work
- Institutions: Oregon State University

Shanaka L de Silva is a British-American geologist, academic and author. He is Sri Lankan by birth but grew up in England where he completed his education. He then moved to the US where he is a professor of geology and geophysics at Oregon State University.

de Silva is most known for his research into how volcanoes develop and erupt and the risks that they pose, primarily focusing on the largest explosive volcanic eruptions on the planet. He has conducted research on volcanoes in many locations including South America, Indonesia, Japan, China/DPRK and Saudi Arabia. Among his authored works are his publications in academic journals, including the Journal of Volcanology and Geothermal Research, Nature, and Journal of Petrology as well as books such as Volcanoes of the Central Andes.

== Education ==
de Silva earned his BSc (Hons). in Geology from the University of Southampton in 1983. In 1987, he went on to receive a PhD in Earth Sciences from the Open University in the United Kingdom.

== Career ==
de Silva began his academic career in 1987 as a visiting postdoctoral fellow at the Lunar and Planetary Institute, a position he held until 1990. From 1991 to 1995, he served as an assistant professor of geology at Indiana State University, before being promoted to associate professor of geology, a role he occupied from 1995 to 2000. In 2000, he was appointed professor of geology at the same institution, a position he held until 2001. Between 2001 and 2006, he undertook concurrent roles at the University of North Dakota, serving as a department head and professor in the Department of Space Studies.

Between 2008 and 2013, de Silva held a fellowship at the NASA Experimental Program for Stimulating Competitive Research and the NASA Space Grant Program. Between 2015 and 2019, he was the vice president of the International Association of Volcanology and Chemistry of the Earth's Interior. Additionally, from 2014 to 2022, he was one of the Science Editors of the journal Geosphere, published by the Geological Society of America. Moreover, he is one of the science editors for GSA Books.

In 2014, de Silva was invited to give expert testimony to the 113th Congress, Natural Resources Sub-Committee on "Volcano Hazards: Exploring the National Preparation and Response Strategy".

== Works ==
de Silva has contributed to various publications, including books, throughout his career. In 1991, he co-authored a catalog on Andean volcanoes, featuring detailed information, satellite images, figures, and descriptions of 44 major, potentially active volcanoes in the region. He and his teams have worked on the Altiplano-Puna plateau in South America for almost three decades and, since 2015, on the Toba volcano in Sumatra, making contributions to the understanding of the largest and most explosive volcanoes on Earth—large calderas—and their relationship to granite batholiths. His work on hazardous volcanoes includes his team's various publications on the 1600 eruption of Volcán Huaynaputina and Misti Volcano in Peru, and the Changbaishan/Paektu volcano on the China/DPRK border. He has also published several works using Earth processes and products as analogues for other planets, most notably Mars.

== Research ==
As part of his volcanism research, de Silva has studied the largest and most explosive volcanoes on Earth, large calderas or supervolcanoes. His 1989 research discovered the Altiplano-Puna Volcanic Complex in the Andes, attributing its formation to large-scale crustal melting caused by crustal thickening and subduction-related magma heat, leading to significant silicic magmatism and extensive ignimbrite eruptions. His work establishes that the formation of complex calderas are the result of crustal processes driven by elevated mantle heat, leading to crustal softening, magma formation, and large-scale volcanic eruptions, thereby redefining such calderas as tectonomagmatic phenomena rather than purely volcanic events. This theme of research has been applied to many other calderas, around the world, including Toba, Sumatra, to help understand their development, evolution and future hazards. In 2007 he contributed to a review that integrated data from volcanic and plutonic rocks to understand them as part of a continuum, proposing that volcanic rocks represent erupted melt-rich regions from crystal-rich reservoirs that later solidify into plutons, ultimately aiming to better understand Earth's magmatic processes and crustal formation.

In 2020, de Silva's team presented an analysis of the eruptive history of Changbaishan-Tianchi volcano, confirming three eruptions including the Generalized Millennium Eruption of 946 CE, while also providing new age estimates and insights into the nature of these eruptions. Additionally, he is serving as the Principal Investigator of a project to establish the current state of the active Cerro Blanco caldera magmatic system in Argentina and its potential to erupt again. He is also the Co-Principal Investigator (Co-PI) of a project, aiming to advance techniques for dating explosive volcanic eruptions in the Asia-Pacific region within the last million years.

== Awards and honors ==
- 1994–1995 – Educational Excellence Award Indiana State University
- 2004–2005 – Departmental Excellence in Teaching, University of North Dakota
- 2011 – Fellow, Geological Society of America
- 2020 – Research Fellow, Alexander von Humboldt Foundation

== Bibliography ==
=== Books ===
- Volcanoes of the Central Andes (1991) ISBN 9783540537069

=== Selected articles ===
- de Silva, S. L. (1989). "Altiplano-Puna volcanic complex of the central Andes". Geology. 17 (12): 1102. Bibcode:1989Geo....17.1102D. doi:10.1130/0091-7613(1989)017<1102:APVCOT>2.3.CO;2.
- Lindsay, J. M.; Schmitt, A. K.; Trumbull, R. B.; de Silva, S. L.; Siebel, W.; Emmermann, R. (March 2001). "Magmatic Evolution of the La Pacana Caldera System, Central Andes, Chile: Compositional Variation of Two Cogenetic, Large-Volume Felsic Ignimbrites". Journal of Petrology. 42 (3): 459–486. doi:10.1093/petrology/42.3.459.
- de Silva, Shanaka; Zandt, George; Trumbull, Robert; Viramonte, José G.; Salas, Guido; Jiménez, Néstor (January 2006). "Large ignimbrite eruptions and volcano-tectonic depressions in the Central Andes: a thermomechanical perspective". Geological Society, London, Special Publications. 269 (1): 47–63. Bibcode:2006GSLSP.269...47D. doi:10.1144/GSL.SP.2006.269.01.04.
- Bachmann, O.; Miller, C.F.; de Silva, S.L. (November 2007). "The volcanic–plutonic connection as a stage for understanding crustal magmatism". Journal of Volcanology and Geothermal Research. 167 (1–4): 1–23. Bibcode:2007JVGR..167....1B. doi:10.1016/j.jvolgeores.2007.08.002.
- de Silva, Shanaka L.; Gosnold, William D. (November 2007). "Episodic construction of batholiths: Insights from the spatiotemporal development of an ignimbrite flare-up". Journal of Volcanology and Geothermal Research. 167 (1–4): 320–335. Bibcode:2007JVGR..167..320D. doi:10.1016/j.jvolgeores.2007.07.015.
