= Luc Moreau =

Computer scientist

- Education: University of Liège
- Known for: Provenance
- Scientific career
- Fields: Computer Science
- Workplaces: University of Southampton, King's College
- Thesis: Sound evaluation of parallel functional programs with first-class continuations (1994)
- Website: nms.kcl.ac.uk/luc.moreau/

Luc Moreau was a professor of Computer Science and Head of the department of Informatics, at King's College London. Before joining King's, Luc was Head of the Web and Internet Science, in the department of Electronics and Computer Science, at the University of Southampton, UK. He is best known for his work in provenance and was co-chair of the W3C provenance working group.

== Editorships ==
Professor Moreau has been the editor for the journal Concurrency and Computation: Practice and Experience, and associate editor of ACM Transactions on Internet Technology.

== Education ==
Moreau's received his Undergraduate Degree in Electrical Engineering from University of Liège in 1989 and his Docteur en Sciences Appliquées (Doctor of Applied Sciences) from the same institution for his work "Sound evaluation of parallel functional programs with first class continuations".

== Research ==
Moreau is best known for his work in the area of digital provenance. With the UK PASOA and FP6 Provenance projects, he delivered the first open specification for provenance and a secure, reference implementation. He initiated the Provenance Challenge: an international activity, to understand inter-operability issues arising when exchanging provenance information. This activity resulted in a novel data model for provenance, known as OPM (Open Provenance Model). The OPM effort led by Moreau and involving over a dozen of co-authors, was developed according to an open source-like governance approach and underwent multiple revisions.
