= 100,000 Genomes Project =

UK Government medical research project

- Project type: Government
- Funding agency: National Institute for Health and Care Research; NHS England
- Reference: doi:10.1136/bmj.k1687
- Project coordinator: Genomics England
- Partners: Scottish Genomes Partnership; Northern Ireland Genomic Medicine Centre; NHS Wales; The Wellcome Trust; Cancer Research UK; Medical Research Council
- Duration: July 2013 – December 2018
- Website: www.genomicsengland.co.uk/about-genomics-england/the-100000-genomes-project/

The 100,000 Genomes Project is a now-completed UK Government project managed by Genomics England that is sequencing whole genomes from National Health Service patients. The project is focusing on rare diseases, some common types of cancer, and infectious diseases. Participants give consent for their genome data to be linked to information about their medical condition and health records. The medical and genomic data is shared with researchers to improve knowledge of the causes, treatment, and care of diseases. The project has received over £300 million from public and private investment.

== History ==
The project was first announced by UK Prime Minister David Cameron in December 2012. The Government set up a new company Genomics England to oversee the project with the plan to focus on rare diseases, cancer, and infectious diseases announced by Health Secretary Jeremy Hunt in July 2013. The project was also made possible by the National Institute for Health and Care Research (NIHR), NHS England, Public Health England, and Health Education England. In 2015, Northern Ireland and Scotland also joined the project with plans to start work the following year. In 2016, the Welsh government issued a statement of intent and is considering participating in the 100,000 Genomes Project.

The initial participants were recruited from Cambridge University Hospitals, University College London Partners, and Newcastle upon Tyne NHS Foundation Trust. The following medical centres joined the project a short time later: Central Manchester University Hospitals NHS Foundation Trust, Great Ormond Street Hospital, Guy's and St Thomas' NHS Foundation Trust, Moorfields Eye Hospital NHS Foundation Trust and Oxford University Hospitals NHS Trust. In total, the coordination of recruitment for the 100,000 Genome Project was overseen by 13 Genomic Medicine Centers that have been established across 85 NHS Trusts in England, Northern Ireland, and Scotland.

In September 2015, Genomics England announced it had contracted with interpretation partners Congenica and Omicia. This is in addition to ongoing work with sequencing partner Illumina.

As of 1 October 2018, the 100,000 Genomes Project had completed the sequencing of 87,231 whole genomes in England and results are in the process of being returned to NHS Genomic Medicine Centres and ultimately back to participants; the first diagnoses from the Project were returned to patients in spring 2015 and over 2,000 families' results have been returned to the NHS in the rare disease programme to date (July 2017).

In December 2018, the full 100,000 genomes milestone was reached.

In July 2019, Genomics England announced Data Release 7, which included the 100,000th whole genome made available to researchers.

A 2019 review identified the initiative as an 'exemplar' in involving the public in genomic research.

In June 2020, Lifebit, a UK-based biotechnology company, was announced as the provider of the trusted research environment that will link the genomic data gathered as part of the 100,000 Genome Project with academic research institutions.

== Research ==
The Genomics England Clinical Interpretation Partnership (GeCIP) includes 2,500 UK and international clinicians and scientists from approximately 300 institutions in 24 countries. There are plans to increase this number. Researchers are organised in "domains" formed around particular conditions, cancer types and research areas such as Machine Learning and Health Economics. The partnership is integrated with the NHS and the aims include improving the use of genotype and phenotype data in healthcare, and providing a platform for genomic research collaborations to add to the knowledge base for genetic disorders.

== GenOMICC study on COVID-19 ==
The 100,000 Genomes Project provided a pre-COVID reference set in the GenOMICC study on COVID-19. Genomics England worked in partnership with the GenOMICC consortium, led by the University of Edinburgh, to analyse the whole genome sequences of approximately 20,000 people who have been severely affected by COVID-19. This data was compared with 15,000 other genomes from people who were only mildly affected. It was combined with data set which now includes more than 120,000 genomes (from the "100,000 Genomes" Project). The 100,000 Genomes Project was referred to as the "incredibly important" pre-COVID reference set.

== See also ==
- Genomics England – UK government-owned company
- Genome project – Scientific endeavours to determine the complete genome sequence of an organism
- Cancer Genome Project
- The Cancer Genome Atlas
