= Genomics England =

UK government-owned company

- Formation: 5 July 2013
- Headquarters: One Canada Square, Canary Wharf, London, England
- Parent organization: Department of Health and Social Care
- Website: www.genomicsengland.co.uk

Genomics England is a company wholly owned by the United Kingdom's Department of Health and Social Care. Established in 2013, it was tasked with delivering the 100,000 Genomes Project, a pioneering initiative that sequenced 100,000 genomes from approximately 85,000 National Health Service patients affected by rare conditions and cancers. This project paved the way for the NHS to incorporate genomic medicine into routine care through the NHS Genomic Medicine Service.

In March 2024, Dr. Rich Scott was appointed Chief Executive Officer of Genomics England, having first joined the organisation in 2015.

== History ==
Genomics England was established in July 2013 as a company fully owned by the UK Department of Health and Social Care. The company was launched by Jeremy Hunt, Secretary of State for Health, on 5 July, in an announcement timed to coincide with the 65th birthday of the NHS.

Genomics England's first major initiative, the 100,000 Genomes Project, began recruiting patients in 2015 and recruitment was completed in 2018 in partnership with NHS England. Its groundbreaking insights into the role genomics can play in healthcare enabled the organisation to continue its partnership with the NHS and Illumina to deliver the NHS Genomic Medicine Service.

== Key Initiatives ==
=== National Genomic Research Library ===
Genomics England operates the National Genomic Research Library, a collection of genomic, clinical, and other health data and samples from NHS patients and participants who have consented to participate. This biorepository is established to facilitate future research, with de-identified data available to approved researchers from approved institutions.

=== GenOMICC Consortium ===
In partnership with the GenOMICC consortium, led by the University of Edinburgh, Genomics England analysed the whole genome sequences of approximately 20,000 people severely affected by COVID-19. The study uncovered numerous new genetic variants associated with severe COVID-19, opening new fields of research focused on potential new therapies and diagnostics.

=== Generation Study ===
In 2021, Genomics England received additional funding from the UK Government for three new initiatives as part of a wider £5 billion package in R&D to spur innovation in healthcare. One of these initiatives is the Generation Study, a research study sequencing the genomes of 100,000 newborn babies in England to evaluate the feasibility, effectiveness, and implications of using whole genome sequencing in newborn screening.

=== Cancer 2.0 ===
Another initiative is Cancer 2.0, which aims to pilot new technologies with the goal of transforming cancer clinical practice and genomic research through the implementation of long-read sequencing technologies in the NHS and by enabling new insights from genomic research in cancer with multi-modal data.

=== Diverse Data ===
Diverse Data is an initiative aimed at reducing health inequalities and improving patient outcomes in genomic medicine for minoritised communities.

=== Rare Therapies Launchpad ===
Genomics England is part of the consortium, formed in 2023, delivering the Rare Therapies Launchpad: a programme that will develop a pathway for children with rare conditions to access individualised therapies.

=== Yellow Card Biobank ===
Together with the Medicines and Healthcare products Regulatory Agency, Genomics England supports the Yellow Card biobank, a genetic research resource to better understand how a patient’s genetic makeup can impact the safety of their medicines. It forms part of a long-term vision for more personalised medicine approaches, as scientists will use the repository of genetic information in the biobank to determine whether a side effect from a medicine was caused by a specific genetic trait.

== Ethics and Governance ==
Genomics England embeds ethics into its operations through dedicated working groups and public engagement. Its Ethics Advisory Committee, which includes participants from its research initiatives, was established to navigate the ethical complexities around consent, bringing genomic analyses into the clinic, and managing emerging issues in supporting genomic research. It provides advice, guidance, review, and recommendations on ethical issues.

Genomics England and its Board are also advised by the Participant Panel – an advisory group for Genomics England working to ensure that the voices of patients, their families, and their experiences inform its work. The Participant Panel is made up of a diverse group of people whose data is held in the National Genomic Research Library. The Panel actively engages in decision-making across other committees and boards, playing a vital role in keeping participants’ interests at the heart of everything Genomics England does.

== Funding ==
The vast majority of Genomics England’s funding comes from the Department of Health and Social Care, which owns the organisation. Genomics England also works with several independent bodies that fund its impact initiatives. These include UK Research and Innovation, LifeArc, National Institute for Health and Care Research, and the Wellcome Trust.

== Legacy and Impact ==
Today, Genomics England operates at the intersection of healthcare and research, providing a clinical service for the NHS while also enabling linked genomic and clinical data to be used for a range of research purposes.

Genomics England’s work has led to earlier and more accurate diagnoses for patients with rare conditions and cancer, advances in cancer treatment, and a strong national genomics infrastructure. The 100,000 Genomes Project’s completion in partnership with NHS England led to a new diagnosis for thousands of rare condition participants and found actionable findings in around 50 per cent of participants with cancer.

Genomics England’s partnership with NHS England continues through the NHS Genomic Medicine Service, which has sequenced over 100,000 whole genomes and led to new diagnoses, more specific treatment based on genetics, and improved outcomes for thousands.

Genomics England runs numerous major research initiatives of national importance. The Generation Study, when complete, will generate evidence around the efficacy of using whole genome sequencing as part of newborn screening for rare conditions that is expected to inform future policy and the wider application of genomics in preventative medicine.

It also continues to provide additional benefit to NHS patients through work and research generated by its other initiatives: ensuring appropriate diversity in the national genomic dataset and delivering new innovations in cancer diagnosis and treatment anchored on validating emerging technologies and datasets.

The National Genomic Research Library is a research database which provides research opportunities to approved researchers from around the world to improve diagnoses and our understanding of health and disease, as well as accelerate the development of new biomarkers, diagnostics, and therapeutic agents.
