= Sengers =

Sengers is a surname. Notable people with the name include:

- Anneke Levelt Sengers (born 1929), Dutch physicist. She is married to Jan and the mother of Phoebe.
- Jan V. Sengers (born 1931), Dutch–American physicist. He is married to Anneke and the father of Phoebe.
- Phoebe Sengers, American computer scientist and ethnographer, daughter of Anneke and Jan.
- R. C. A. Sengers, Dutch medical researcher, namesake of Sengers syndrome

== See also ==
- Senger, German surname
- Sengers Ladies Cycling Team, Belgian sports club
