= Assael =

Assael is a surname. Notable people with this surname include:

- Jacqueline Assaël (born 1957), French academic
- John Assael (born 1950), British architect
- Marc J. Assael (born 1954), Greek chemical engineer
- Shaun Assael (born 1962), American journalist
- Steven Assael (born 1957), American painter
