= Yeram S. Touloukian =

American professor

- Yeram S. Touloukian
- Born: December 28, 1920; Istanbul, Turkey
- Died: June 12, 1981 (aged 60); Bethesda, Maryland, United States
- Education: Robert College; Massachusetts Institute of Technology; Purdue University
- Known for: Thermophysical Properties of Matter; Established the Thermophysical Properties Research Center at Purdue University in 1957
- Scientific career
- Fields: Thermophysics, thermophysical properties, mechanical engineering
- Workplaces: Purdue University

Yeram Sarkis Touloukian (December 28, 1920 – June 12, 1981) was an American professor of mechanical engineering and director of the Thermophysical Properties Research Center (now known as CINDAS) at Purdue University in West Lafayette, Indiana. He was world-renowned for his work in thermophysics and his name has become synonymous with the field of thermophysical properties.

== Early life ==
Touloukian was born December 28, 1920, of Armenian parents in Istanbul, Turkey. He received his bachelor's degree in mechanical engineering from Robert College in Istanbul, Turkey in 1939. Following the completion of his degree, Touloukian went to the United States to pursue his graduate studies. He received his master's degree from the Massachusetts Institute of Technology in 1941 and his Doctor of Philosophy (Ph.D.) from Purdue University in 1946.

While attending MIT in 1942, Touloukian was chairman of The M.I.T. East and West Association; an association that was organized to encourage mutual understanding between students from the East and the West.

Touloukian married Hersil Istanbullu on August 8, 1948, in London, England after a long distance courtship.

== Career at Purdue University ==
After completing his Ph.D., Touloukian became an instructor at Purdue University. He was appointed to the position of Assistant Professor in the School of Mechanical Engineering in 1948, Associate Professor in 1953, and Full Professor in 1957. He became Distinguished Alcoa Professor of Engineering in 1967, and in 1970 was honored once again to the Chair of Distinguished Atkins Professor of Engineering.

Touloukian taught numerous graduate courses at Purdue University in thermodynamics and in heat and mass transfer. During his teaching career, he developed many new courses in physical thermodynamics and was the first to introduce a course in an engineering curricula in the area of "Thermodynamics of Irreversible Processes" in 1953. He was the major professor of a total of 65 Ph.D. and M.S. students and directed the original research for their Ph.D. dissertations and M.S. theses.

Besides his teaching and research career, Touloukian served as a consultant to a number of government agencies and industrial organizations. He was also appointed to numerous scientific and technical committees and boards of scientific and technical societies and government panels. These included:

- National Academy of Sciences – National Research Council Advisory Board of the Office of Critical Tables (1958-1969)
- ASME Standing Committee on Thermophysical Properties (member 1947–1970, chairman 1948–1951, 1956–1959)
- Editorial Advisory Board, "International Journal of Heat and Mass Transfer." (starting 1960)
- Editorial Advisory Board, International Journal, "High Temperatures/High Pressures." (starting 1968)
- Editorial Advisory Board, "Heat Transfer-Soviet Research" (starting 1969)
- Editorial Advisory Board, "Heat Transfer-Japanese Research" (starting 1972)
- Editorial Board, "International Journal of Thermophysics" (starting 1980)
- ASTM-ASME Joint Research Committee on Effect of Temperature on the Properties of Metals (1960-1968)
- ASTM Special Committee on Numerical Data (1963-1968)
- Gordon Research Conference on Numerical Data of Science and Technology, Chairman (1966)
- Engineering Joint Council "Panel on Information Centers Managers" (1964-1965)
- AIAA "Technical Committee on Thermophysics" (1964-1968)
- American Society of Information Sciences, Councilor and Member of Board of Directors (1965-1967)
- ASM "Metals Information Committee" (1965-1968)
- Applied Mechanics Reviews, Associate Editor (1966)
- National Academy of Sciences/National Academy of Engineering "Scientific and Technical Communication Committee (SATCOM) (1967-1969)
- International CODATA/ICSU Task Group on Thermophysical Properties, Chairman (1972-1978)
- Editorial Board, American Institute of Physics "50th Anniversary (1981) Physics Handbook."

== Thermophysical Properties Research Center (TPRC) ==
Touloukian singlehandedly conceived and established the Thermophysical Properties Research Center (TPRC) at Purdue University in 1957. Under Touloukian's technical and administrative leadership, TPRC quickly attained national and international recognition as a unique institution; the first of its kind. The TPRC was the world center for organizing and disseminating data on the thermophysical properties of materials.

In the late 1950s the US Bureau of Standards brought together all that was then known about thermophysical properties of various materials. Information had multiplied since that time and Touloukian and others worked in whatever space was available in the School of Mechanical Engineering to bring the information up to date. The project was handled in three stages: 1. Retrieving of data on the thermophysical properties of about 10,000 different materials. 2. Reconciliation of theory and fact and filling in the gaps by means of research. 3. Assembling and publishing the information. After reaching a publishing agreement with McGraw-Hill and increasing support from the Space Agency, Air Force, Army, Wright Field and National Bureau of Standards, the project had grown to the point where it was too big for its operation in Mechanical Engineering. In 1962, the Trustees approved the construction of a new facility in McClure Park for the TPRC.

=== Expansion and restructuring ===
- The Air Force established the Department of Defense (DoD) Thermophysical Properties Information Center (TPIC) at the TPRC in 1960.
- The National Bureau of Standards selected TPRC in 1964 as one of the first three external centers to become a component of the National Standard Reference Data System (NSRDS).
- The National Science Foundation established the Underground Excavation and Rock Properties Information Center (UERPIC) at TPRC in 1972.
- The Defense Logistics Agency moved the Electronic Properties Information Center (EPIC) from Hughes Aircraft Company to Purdue University to merge with TPRC's TPIC in 1973, which resulted in the DoD Thermophysical and Electronic Properties Information Analysis Center (TEPIAC) of TPRC.

Due to the enlargement and scope of its operation by the addition of UERPIC, EPIC, and TEPIAC, the TPRC was restructured in 1974 to become the Center for Information and Numerical Data Analysis and Synthesis (CINDAS), which comprises all four of the centers.

== International and domestic collaboration ==
- Served as a Visiting Lecturer on Thermodynamics of Irreversible Processes at Auburn University.
- Served as an External Examiner of the University of Rajasthan, India.
- Visited institutions of higher learning and research centers in Great Britain, Netherlands, West Germany, France, Belgium and the U.S.S.R. for the specific purpose of making detailed studies of theoretical and experimental work underway in these countries in the field of physical thermodynamics and transport phenomena. (1959)
- Provided general direction for research at the Kyoto Institute of Technology in Kyoto, Japan being conducted for Purdue University as part of a US Government contract research project. (1964-1965)
- Attended the IAEA conference on Thermodynamics in Vienna to discuss data collection at Brussels. Official USAEC delegate. (1965)
- Provided general direction for the establishment of a European Information Branch of the TPRC at the Institut Belge des Hautes Pressions in Belgium. (1966)
- Visited the University of Karlsruhe in Karlsruhe, Germany.
- Presented a paper at the first ever international CODATA conference in Frankfurt, Germany. (1966)
- Invited guest of the U.S.S.R. Academy of Sciences for a lecture tour through the U.S.S.R. (1967)

== Patents and publications ==
=== Patents ===
- U.S. Patent 2,548,081, Flash Evaporator, issued April 10, 1951.

=== Publications ===
Touloukian authored or co-authored 35 research papers, 15 technical reports, and 8 research bulletins. He also authored or coauthored 18 volumes of reference books with a total of 20,132 pages and was the editor or coeditor of 57 volumes of reference books with a total of 41,655 pages. He was also a reviewer, discussor and abstractor of over 150 scientific and technical publications.

Touloukian, Y. S., and Purdue University. Thermophysical Properties of Matter: The TPRC Data Series; a Comprehensive Compilation of Data. Ed. Y. S. Touloukian. New York: IFI/Plenum, 1970. ISBN 0306670208.

- Volume 1: Thermal Conductivity, Metallic Elements and Alloys
- Volume 2: Thermal Conductivity, Nonmetallic Solids
- Volume 3: Thermal Conductivity, Nonmetallic Liquids and Gases
- Volume 4: Specific Heat, Metallic Elements and Alloys
- Volume 5: Specific Heat, Nonmetallic Solids
- Volume 6: Specific Heat, Nonmetallic Liquids and Gases
- Volume 7: Thermal Radiative Properties, Metallic Elements and Alloys
- Volume 8: Thermal Radiative Properties, Nonmetallic Solids
- Volume 9: Thermal Radiative Properties, Coatings
- Volume 10: Thermal Diffusivity
- Volume 11: Viscosity
- Volume 12: Thermal Expansion, Metallic Elements and Alloys
- Volume 13: Thermal Expansion, Nonmetallic Solids

== Yeram S. Touloukian Award ==
The Yeram S. Touloukian Award was established in 1988 by the ASME Heat Transfer Division K-7 Committee on Thermophysical Properties and became an ASME Society Award in 1997. It is bestowed triennially at the Symposium on Thermophysical Properties to recognize outstanding technical contributions in the field of thermophysical properties. An individual who is internationally recognized for major contributions in the thermophysical properties field is eligible to receive this award. Fields recognized by the award include, but are not limited to, mechanical engineering, chemical engineering, physics, and chemistry. Funding to support the award was provided by Purdue University to honor the contributions of Yeram Touloukian.

=== Recipients ===
1988	E. U. Franck; Paul Klemens
1991	Jan V. Sengers; Tadashi Makita
1994	Joseph Kestin; Guy White
1997	Ared Cezairliyan; William Wakeham
2000	Akira Nagashima
2003	Raymond E. Taylor; Wolfgang Wagner
2006	Johanna Levelt Sengers
2009	Andreas Mandelis; Koichi Watanabe
2012	Peter T. Cummings; Michael Moldover
2015	Mikhail A. Anisimov; David G. Cahill
2018	Alfred Leipertz; J. Ilja Siepmann
2021	Carolyn A. Koh; Zhuomin Zhang
2024	Mark O. McLinden; Li Shi

== Honors and awards ==
- The Gold Medal Award of the Associazione Termotecnica Italiana (1968)
- The American Society of Mechanical Engineers Heat Transfer Memorial Award (1974)
- The International Thermal Conductivity Conference Award (1977)
- The Award of the International Thermophysics Congress (1981 - posthumously)
