= Alfred Leipertz =

- Occupations: Physicist, engineer, and academian

Academic background
- Education: Doctor of Engineering; Habilitation in Heat and Mass Transfer
- Alma mater: Justus Liebig University Giessen; Ruhr University Bochum

Alfred Leipertz is a physicist, engineer, and academian. He is an emeritus chair professor of Engineering Thermodynamics and senior professor of Chemical Engineering at the Friedrich-Alexander University of Erlangen-Nuremberg (FAU). Leipertz co-founded the Erlangen Graduate School in Advanced Optical Technologies (SAOT) at FAU, established under the Excellence Initiative of the German Federal and State Governments. He has also served as director emeritus and ambassador of SAOT.

Leipertz is a fellow of the International Union of Pure and Applied Chemistry (IUPAC), Optica, and The Combustion Institute. He is also a recipient of the Yeram S. Touloukian Award from the American Society of Mechanical Engineers (ASME).

== Education ==
From 1968 to 1974, Leipertz studied mathematics, chemistry, and physics at the Justus Liebig University Giessen. He earned his Doctor of Engineering degree from Ruhr University Bochum in 1979, followed by his Habilitation (Venia Legendi) in Heat and Mass Transfer in 1984.

== Career ==
In 1974, Leipertz began his career as a physicist at the German Aerospace Center. From 1975 to 1976, he worked as a research assistant in the Department of Mechanical Engineering at the Duisburg University. Between 1977 and 1984, he served as a research assistant and assistant professor at the Ruhr University. From 1984 to 1986, Leipertz continued teaching at Ruhr University as a Privatdozent. He later held two appointments there: tenured associate professor of Experimental Heat and Mass Transfer from 1986 to 1988, and full professor of Laser Techniques from 1988 to 1989. Subsequently, he joined the Friedrich-Alexander University of Erlangen-Nuremberg (FAU) as chair professor of Engineering Thermodynamics, a position he held until his retirement in 2014. Since then, he has held the title of emeritus chair professor.

Leipertz co-founded the Erlangen Graduate School in Advanced Optical Technologies (SAOT) at FAU as part of the German Excellence Initiative, serving as its director until 2014. Since then, he has held the titles of ambassador and director emeritus of SAOT.

During his academic career, Leipertz has authored patents and published research papers that have collectively received over 16,500 citations, with an h-index of 66. He is also the author of textbooks, including Engineering Thermodynamics for Mechanical Engineers, Production Engineers, and Chemical and Bioengineers, Wärme- und Stoffübertragung, and Einführung in die Verbrennungstechnik. He additionally holds the title of emeritus member of the International Association for Transport Properties (IATP).

Outside academia, Leipertz established the ESYTEC Energie- und Systemtechnik GmbH company, which he managed as technical director and chief executive officer (CEO).

== Research ==
Leipertz's research interests have focused on engineering thermodynamics and adjacent areas, including condensation dependability on surface wettability, laser-induced fluorescence (LIF) spectroscopy, light scattering analysis, and Raman and Rayleigh scattering techniques. He also worked on photon correlation spectroscopy, investigated ionic liquids, and predicted ionic liquids' thermal conductivity.

To achieve dropwise condensation (DWC), Leipertz formed amorphous layers of hydrogenated Diamond-Like Carbon on a flat copper surface and discovered that DWC has an 11-fold higher heat transfer coefficient than filmwise condensation (FWC). He also examined the impact of DWC on water production costs, concluding that increasing heat transfer coefficients reduces the temperature difference between the evaporator and condenser, lowering compressor work requirements. Additionally, he studied uncoated and coated horizontal plain, high-performance, and standard finned tubes to determine the condensing heat transfer coefficients of R134a and R290.

Together with Al-Badri and others, Leipertz employed an analytical model to estimate the condensing heat transfer coefficient. However, he also highlighted other analytical approaches, including jet impingement boiling for heat transfer. In combustion research, he focused on the structure of methane-air flames, underscoring the influence of pressure on the flame front curvature. Moreover, he documented that laser-based techniques reveal plasma and electrohydrodynamic process insights.

Together with Pfadler and Beyrau, Leipertz worked on conditioned particle image velocimetry (CPIV) and carried out a comparison between the flame edge extracted from OH-PLIF and Mie scattering images. In line with this, they implemented a flame front detection method to locate the flame front location in a particle image velocimetry (PIV) measurement. He employed PIV and Planar Filtered Rayleigh scattering thermometry (FRS) to determine velocity.

Leipertz collaborated with Badock and others on a study to investigate the internal flow for the diesel injector nozzles under 1.5 MPa pressure, documenting no cavitation films or bubbles inside the nozzle holes. He studied the laser-induced incandescence (LII) tool to assess the distribution of soot particle size and also established LII as a tool for the production of carbon black. Furthermore, he carried out a research study to assess the soot temperature, demonstrating how the vaporization of soot causes a sudden change in the temperature of soot particles within 100 ns of laser pulse irradiance, and how conduction loss controls the temperature decay rates.

Leipertz employed inelastic and elastic light scattering methods to investigate how the concentration of the solute affected the supercritical antisolvent (SAS) process, documenting the solute's saturation solubility in solvent/antisolvent mixtures as an indirect differentiation measure for distinguishing between crystallizing and amorphous precipitating. He highlighted that local information about the combustion zone, spatial droplet distribution, temperature in the flame, and nucleation zone can be acquired by employing 2D-chemiluminescence imaging, CARS (coherent anti-Stokes Raman spectroscopy), and laser-sheet-based Mie scattering imaging.

Throughout his research career, Leipertz also collaborated with other scientists on various themes such as laser-induced gratings (LIG) for measurements in a propane mixture, laser-induced breakdown spectroscopy (LIBS) for determining gas temperature, and rotational coherent anti-Stokes Raman spectroscopy (RCARS).

== Awards and honors ==
- 2000 – Elected member, Wissenschaftlicher Arbeitskreis Technische Thermodynamik (WATT eV)
- 2007 – Fellow, Optica
- 2009 – Longtime Member Service Award, International Society of Automotive Engineers (SAE)
- 2009 – Fellow, International Society of Automotive Engineers (SAE)
- 2011 – Honorary doctorate, University of Maribor
- 2018 – Yeram S. Touloukian Award, ASME
- 2018 – Fellow, The Combustion Institute
- Fellow, IUPAC
- Honorary member, WATT eV
