= Andreas Mandelis =

Greek physicist (b. 1952)

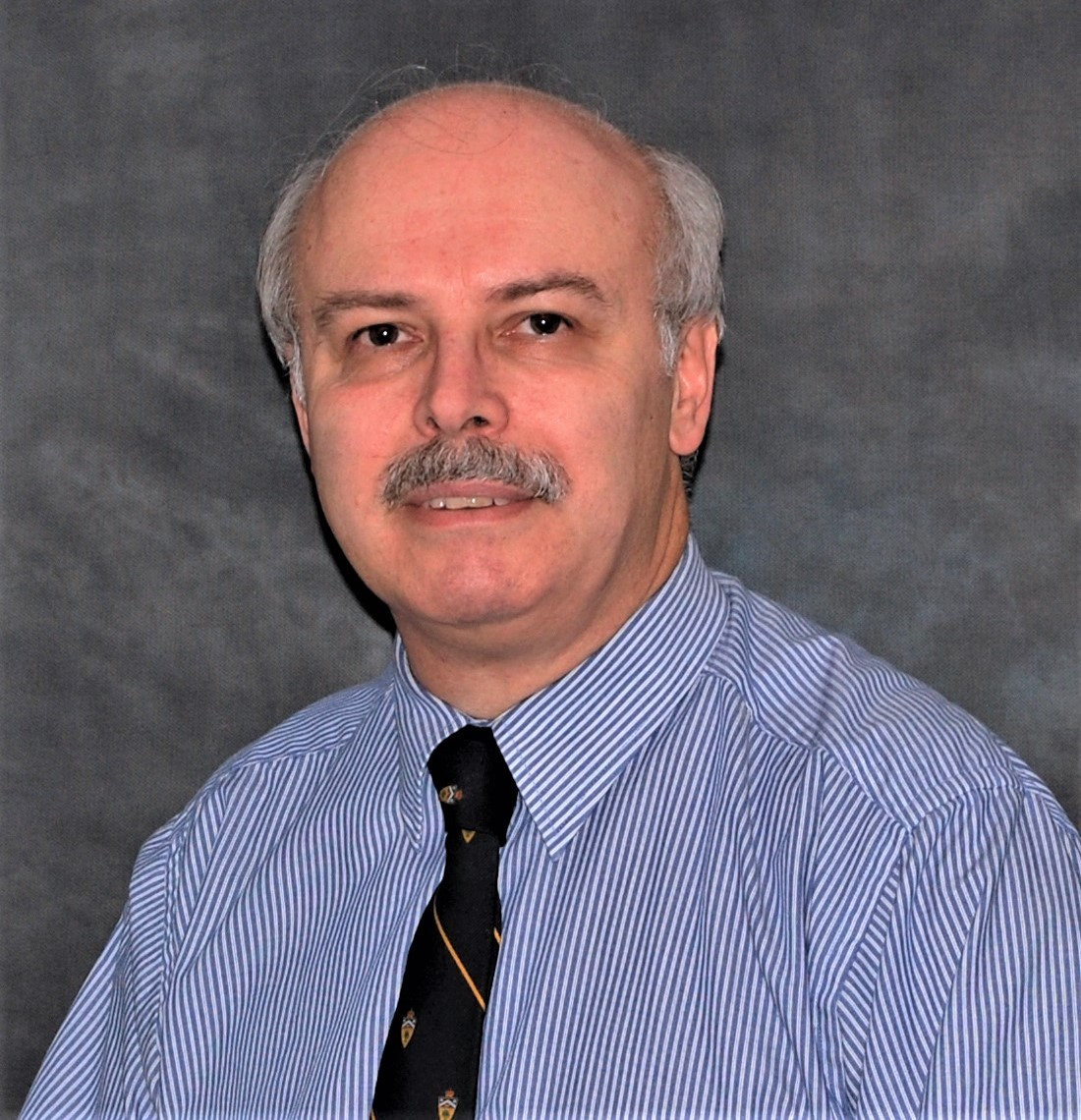
- Born: 22 June 1952 (age 74); Corfu, Greece
- Education: Yale University (B.S.); Princeton University (Ph.D.)
- Known for: Photothermal spectroscopy, Photoacoustic spectroscopy
- Awards: Alexander von Humboldt Research Award, Yeram S. Touloukian Award, Killam Prize
- Scientific career
- Fields: Photonics, physics, biophotonics
- Workplaces: University of Toronto

Andreas Mandelis, FRSC, FAAAS, DF-IETI, FCAE, FAPS, FSPIE, FASME, (Greek: Ανδρέας Μανδέλης; born 22 June 1952) is a Greek-Canadian physicist who is a professor and researcher in the department of Mechanical and Industrial Engineering at the University of Toronto. He is the director of the Center for Advanced Diffusion-Wave and Photoacoustic Technologies (CADIPT). and of the Institute for Advanced Non-Destructive and Non-Invasive Diagnostic Technologies (IANDIT) at the University of Toronto.

He is an expert in thermophotonics and is considered a pioneer in the fields of diffusion wave, photothermal, and photoacoustic sciences and related technologies. His research interests encompass studies of physical energy conversion processes in condensed and biological matter as they impact instrumentation science and signal generation technologies with applications spanning the development of a wide spectrum of novel instrumentation, measurement and imaging techniques using optical-to-thermal, thermoelastic, electronic, ultrasonic and/or photonic energy conversion high-dynamic-range and high-sensitivity analytical methodologies, leading to advanced non-destructive/non-invasive diagnostic, inspection and monitoring technologies with major focus on advanced dynamic imaging instrumentation for industrial and biomedical applications. He is the inventor of a photothermal imaging radar which can detect tooth decay at an early stage, can detect the onset of cancerous lesions in soft tissues, cracks in teeth and monitor dental structural integrity over time. His research team also pioneered and patented 22 analytical instrumentation and measurement methodologies and metrologies.

== Early life and education ==
Mandelis was born in Corfu, Greece. He received his B.S. in physics (Magna cum Laude) from Yale University in 1974. He then pursued graduate studies at Princeton University, where he received a Ph.D. in Applied Physics and Materials Science in 1980 after completing a doctoral dissertation titled "Theory of the frequency and time domain photoacoustic spectroscopy of condensed phases."

== Career ==
After graduating from Princeton, Mandelis worked as a researcher at Bell-Northern Research Labs in Ottawa from 1980 to 1981. He has authored and co-authored over 475 papers which have appeared in world-class peer-reviewed journals and more than 190 papers in scientific and technical proceedings. He has several inventions, 43 patents and patents pending in the areas of photothermal tomographic imaging, signal processing and measurement, hydrogen sensors, dental and soft and hard tissue laser diagnostics (biothermophotonics), several semiconductor optoelectronic non-destructive diagnostic technologies and laser biophotoacoustic and biothermophotonic imaging.

He has been editor-in-chief of the book series "Progress in Photothermal and Photoacoustic Science and Technology " which was published by the Society for Optical Engineering (SPIE). He is the director of the Center for Advanced Diffusion-Wave and Photoacoustic Technologies (CADIPT) at the University of Toronto, formerly known as Centre for Advanced Diffusion-Wave Technologies (CADIFT). He is also the director of the Institute for Advanced Non-Destructive and Non-Invasive Diagnostic Technologies (IANDIT) in the Faculty of Applied Science and Engineering at the University of Toronto. He has appeared as the guest editor in special publications in the area of photoacoustic, photothermal and diffusion-wave phenomena.

He has been editor-in-chief of the Springer International Journal of Thermophysics. (2014–19) (Currently Editor-in-Chief Emeritus,), Topical Editor of the OSA Journal Optics Letters (2012-18), and on the editorial board of the International Journal of Thermophysics and the SPIE Journal of Biomedical Optics (2010-23). He is Contributing Editor of the AIP flagship magazine Physics Today. He is also an associate editor for the American Institute of Physics (AIP) journals Review of Scientific Instruments and the Journal of Applied Physics, on the scientific advisory board of the online journal Diffusion Fundamentals and on the Scientific Advisory Board of Quantitative InfraRed Thermography (QIRT) Journal (Lavoisier Press, France). He has also been a member in the editorial and advisory boards of the SPIE Journal of Biomedical Optics in the areas of photothermal imaging, dental optics, and photoacoustic tomography, Applied Physics Letters, NDT&E International, and Analytical Sciences (J. Chem. Soc. Japan). He is contributing editor for Physics Today of the American Institute of Physics.

Mandelis is a Fellow of the Royal Society of Canada, a Fellow of the American Physical Society (APS), a Fellow of the SPIE, a Fellow of the ASME, Fellow of the Canadian Academy of Engineering, and a Fellow of the American Association for the Advancement of Science. and a Distinguished Fellow of the International Engineering and Technology Institute (IETI).

He is an expert in applied photonics, imaging, optoelectronics, materials science and biophotonics. He is considered a pioneer in the fields of diffusion-wave, photothermal and photoacoustic sciences and related technologies and his research is recognized as having helped define and develop these areas. He also pioneered the Thermal-Wave Resonant Cavity, which has applications in the fields of molecular thermophysics, kinetic theory and the infrared emissivity of fluids. Mandelis has created the field of dental photonic engineering and the optoelectronic technique of photocarrier radiometry. Mandelis and his research group achieved three-dimensional thermophonic super resolution imaging by spatiotemporal diffusion reversal methods, a breakthrough in photothermal (thermophotonic) imaging which has historically been severely limited in resolution by the physics of diffusive blurring.

Andreas Mandelis is a full professor at the Department of Mechanical and Industrial Engineering at the University of Toronto which he joined in 1981. He is also a professor at the Electrical and Computer Engineering department and the Institute of Biomaterials and Biomedical Engineering at the same university. His current research interests include building theoretical and experimental foundations of thermophysical, biothermophotonic and biophotoacoustic transport phenomena, high-performance diagnostic imaging techniques and advanced signal generation and processing methods ("waveform engineering") for semiconductors, photovoltaic solar cells, hard (dental, bone) and soft tissues, novel photothermal biosensors, and defect inspection in industrial materials. Examples of applications are in the fields of alternative clean energy conversion devices (e.g. solar cells, nano-optoelectronics devices), industrial manufactured products (steels, metal composites, nano-coatings), thermophysical inverse problems in solids and industrial materials, and biomedical and dental disease diagnostics, with major focus on advanced dynamic imaging instrumentation.

== Quantum Dental Technologies ==
Mandelis is co-founder and chief technology officer of Quantum Dental Technologies (QDT) The QDT device, named the "Canary System", uses laser pulses to detect tooth decay and is used as a non-invasive alternative to traditional methods including x-rays. The machine detects tooth demineralization at an early stage so that the damage can be repaired using remineralization components and avoiding the use of drills.

== Diffusion-Wave Diagnostic Technologies ==
Mandelis is also the founder of Diffusion-Wave Diagnostic Technologies (DWDT). Current focus of DWDT is in design and assembly of solar cell and optoelectronic material/device imaging modalities developed at the Center for Advanced Diffusion-Wave and Photoacoustic Technologies, University of Toronto: lock-In carrierography (LIC) non-destructive imagers; thermophotonic (photothermal coherence tomography) dynamic thermal-wave radar based and lock-in thermography non-destructive imagers; biomedical photoacoustic endoscopy and hard tissue imagers; non-invasive blood glucose and cannabis biosensors; signal processing development for software lock-in systems.

== Memberships and awards ==
- Academician: Fellow of the Royal Society of Canada, Academy of Science (2006)
- Academician: Fellow of the Canadian Academy of Engineering (2014).
- Fellow, American Physical Society (1993).
- 2004 New Pioneers Award in Science and Technology, Skills for Change, City of Toronto.
- Alexander von Humboldt Research Award, Humboldt Foundation, Germany.
- Member of K7 (ASME) International Committee on Thermophysics.
- Fellow, International Society for Optical Engineering (SPIE) (2003)
- Premier's Inaugural Discovery Award in Science and Engineering, Ministry of Research and Innovation, Ontario (2007).
- Canada Research Chair (Tier 1) in Diffusion-Wave Sciences and Technologies (2008-2015-2022).
- 2009 Yeram S. Touloukian Award in Thermophysics, ASME.
- 2009 Senior Prize of the International Photoacoustic and Photothermal Association.
- 2009 Canadian Association of Physicists (CAP) Medal for Outstanding Achievement in Industrial and Applied Physics.
- 2010 Chair of the Board and President of the International Photoacoustic and Photothermal Association.
- Canada Council for the Arts Killam Research Fellowship.
- 2012 Joseph F. Keithley Award For Advances in Measurement Science. Citation: "For seminal contributions to the development of new experimental techniques based on photothermal science, and the application of these techniques to a variety of real-world problems."
- 2012 Canadian Association of Physicists (CAP)-INO Medal for Outstanding Achievement in Applied Photonics.
- Fellow, American Association for the Advancement of Science (AAAS) (2012).
- 2013 University of Toronto Inventor of the Year Award.
- Fellow, American Society for Mechanical Engineering (2013).
- 2014 Killam Prize
- Recipient of the Inaugural Canadian NDT Research Award (2017).
- Distinguished Fellow, International Engineering & Technology Institute (IETI) (2018).
- 5th International Engineering and Technology Institute (IETI) Annual Scientific Award Winner (2020).
- Career Award, ULTRASONICS 2020, PROTEOMASS Scientific Society, Portugal.
- Fellowship, Constatiniana Academy of Arts and Sciences (Accademia Angelico Costantitiana di Lettere Arti e Scienze) (Italy).
- Founder and Co-director of biennial Mediterranean International School of Quantum Electronics, Progress in Photoacoustic & Photothermal Phenomena, Center Ettore Majorana in Erice (Sicily, Italy).
- Andreas Mandelis has been honored by the American Institute of Physics (AIP) Journal of Applied Physics with a Festschrift on the occasion of his 70th birthday (2022).
- ScholarGPS Highly Ranked Scholar status: "[Andreas Mandelis'] prolific publication record, the high impact of his work, and the outstanding quality of [his] scholarly contributions have placed [him] in the top 0.01% in Engineering and Computer Science and 0.03% in digital imaging."
- Recipient of VIII Pan-American Congress on Non-Destructive Testing Research Award, awarded every 4 years: "For outstanding and sustained excellence within NDT research and development that has contributed to innovation and/or breakthroughs that have benefited society and industry partners", June 11, 2025, Niagara Falls, ON, Canada.
- Advanced Materials Laureate 2025, International Association of Advanced Materials (IAAM), Ulrika, Sweden, "for many novel instrumentation and measurement methodologies in the advanced field of biothermophotonics which he pioneered". August 18, 2025, Stockholm, Sweden.

== Selected publications ==
List of selected publications:

- Mandelis, Andreas; Zver, Martin M. (1985). "Theory of photopyroelectric spectroscopy of solids". Journal of Applied Physics. 57 (9). AIP Publishing: 4421–4430. Bibcode:1985JAP....57.4421M. doi:10.1063/1.334565. ISSN 0021-8979.
- Mandelis, Andreas (1984). "Frequency-domain photopyroelectric spectroscopy of condensed phases (PPES): A new, simple and powerful spectroscopic technique". Chemical Physics Letters. 108 (4). Elsevier BV: 388–392. Bibcode:1984CPL...108..388M. doi:10.1016/0009-2614(84)85212-4. ISSN 0009-2614.
- Mandelis, A.; Teng, Y. C.; Royce, B. S. H. (1979). "Phase measurements in the frequency domain photoacoustic spectroscopy of solids". Journal of Applied Physics. 50 (11). AIP Publishing: 7138–7146. Bibcode:1979JAP....50.7138M. doi:10.1063/1.325823. ISSN 0021-8979.
- Mandelis, Andreas (2000). "Diffusion Waves and their Uses". Physics Today. 53 (8). AIP Publishing: 29–34. Bibcode:2000PhT....53h..29M. doi:10.1063/1.1310118. ISSN 0031-9228.
- Mandelis, Andreas; Batista, Jerias; Shaughnessy, Derrick (2003-05-21). "Infrared photocarrier radiometry of semiconductors: Physical principles, quantitative depth profilometry, and scanning imaging of deep subsurface electronic defects". Physical Review B. 67 (20) 205208. American Physical Society (APS). Bibcode:2003PhRvB..67t5208M. doi:10.1103/physrevb.67.205208. ISSN 0163-1829.
- Fan, Ying; Mandelis, Andreas; Spirou, Gloria; Alex Vitkin, I. (2004). "Development of a laser photothermoacoustic frequency-swept system for subsurface imaging: Theory and experiment". The Journal of the Acoustical Society of America. 116 (6). Acoustical Society of America (ASA): 3523–3533. Bibcode:2004ASAJ..116.3523F. doi:10.1121/1.1819393. ISSN 0001-4966. PMID 15658704. Paper selected for inclusion in Virtual Journal of Biological Physics Research (www.vjbio.org), 8 (12) (Dec. 15, 2004).
- Jeon, R.J.; Han, C.; Mandelis, A.; Sanchez, V.; Abrams, S.H. (2004). "Diagnosis of Pit and Fissure Caries Using Frequency-Domain Infrared Photothermal Radiometry and Modulated Laser Luminescence". Caries Research. 38 (6). S. Karger AG: 497–513. doi:10.1159/000080579. ISSN 0008-6568. PMID 15528904. S2CID 7353804.
- Christofides, Constantinos; Mandelis, Andreas (1990-09-15). "Solid-state sensors for trace hydrogen gas detection". Journal of Applied Physics. 68 (6). AIP Publishing: R1–R30. Bibcode:1990JAP....68R...1C. doi:10.1063/1.346398. ISSN 0021-8979.
- Tabatabaei, Nima; Mandelis, Andreas; Amaechi, Bennett T. (2011-04-18). "Thermophotonic radar imaging: An emissivity-normalized modality with advantages over phase lock-in thermography". Applied Physics Letters. 98 (16). AIP Publishing: 163706. Bibcode:2011ApPhL..98p3706T. doi:10.1063/1.3582243. ISSN 0003-6951.
- Guo, Xinxin; Mandelis, Andreas; Zinman, Bernard (2012-10-29). "Noninvasive glucose detection in human skin using wavelength modulated differential laser photothermal radiometry". Biomedical Optics Express. 3 (11). The Optical Society: 3012–21. doi:10.1364/boe.3.003012. ISSN 2156-7085. PMC 3493219. PMID 23162736.
- S. Kaiplavil and A. Mandelis, "Truncated-correlation photothermal coherence tomography for deep subsurface analysis", Nature Photonics DOI: 10.10.1038/NPHOTON.2014.111 (1 – 8) (June 29, 2014).
- L. Hu, A. Mandelis, X. Lan, A. Melnikov, S. Hoogland, and E. H.Sargent, "Imbalanced Hole Mobility and Schottky Junction Induced Anomalous Current-Voltage Characteristics of Excitonic PbS Colloidal Quantum Dot Solar Cells", Solar Energy Materials Solar Cells 155, 155-165 (2016) http://dx.doi.org/10.1016/j.solmat.2016.06.012
- P. Tavakolian, K. Sivagurunathan, and A. Mandelis, "Enhanced truncated-correlation photothermal coherence tomography with application to deep subsurface defect imaging and 3-dimensional reconstructions", J. Appl. Phys. 122, 023103 (2017); doi: 10.1063/1.4992807.
- P. Tavakolian, S. Roointan, A. Mandelis and W. Shi, « Non-Invasive In-Vivo 3-D Imaging of Small Animals Using Spatially Filtered Enhanced Truncated-Correlation Photothermal Coherence Tomography », (Nature) Scientific Reports 10, 13743 (10 pages) (2020). https://doi.org/10.1038/s41598-020-70815-3
- S. Roointan, P. Tavakolian, K. S. Sivagurunathan, M. Floryan, A. Mandelis, and S. H. Abrams, "3D Dental Subsurface Imaging Using Enhanced Truncated-Correlation Photothermal Coherence Tomography", (Nature) Scientific Reports 9, 16788 (12 pages) (2019). https://doi.org/10.1038/s41598-019-53170-w
- X. Guo, D. Zhang, K. Shojaei-Asanjan, K. Sivagurunathan, A. Melnikov, P. Song, and A. Mandelis « Noninvasive in-vivo glucose detection in human finger interstitial fluid using wavelength-modulated differential photothermal radiometry », J. Biophotonics 12 : e201800441), 1 – 8 (July 2019) / doi.org: 10.1002/jbio.201800441
- D. Thapa, P. Tavakolian, G. Zhou, A. Zhang, A. Abdelgawad, E. Baradaran Shokouhi1, K. Sivagurunathan and A. Mandelis, « Three-dimensional thermophotonic super-resolution imaging by spatiotemporal diffusion reversal methods », Science Advances 9 (51), eadi1899 (9 pages) (22 Dec. 2023), DOI: 10.1126/sciadv.adi1899
- D. Thapa, K. Sivagurunathan, A. Melnikov, and A. Mandelis, "Three-dimensional super-resolution crack imaging in industrial manufactured components: A truncated correlation photothermal coherence tomography approach", NDT&E Int. 146, 103145 (10 pages), May 2024; https://doi.org/10.1016/j.ndteint.2024.103145
