= Iryna Adamenko =

Ukrainian scientist

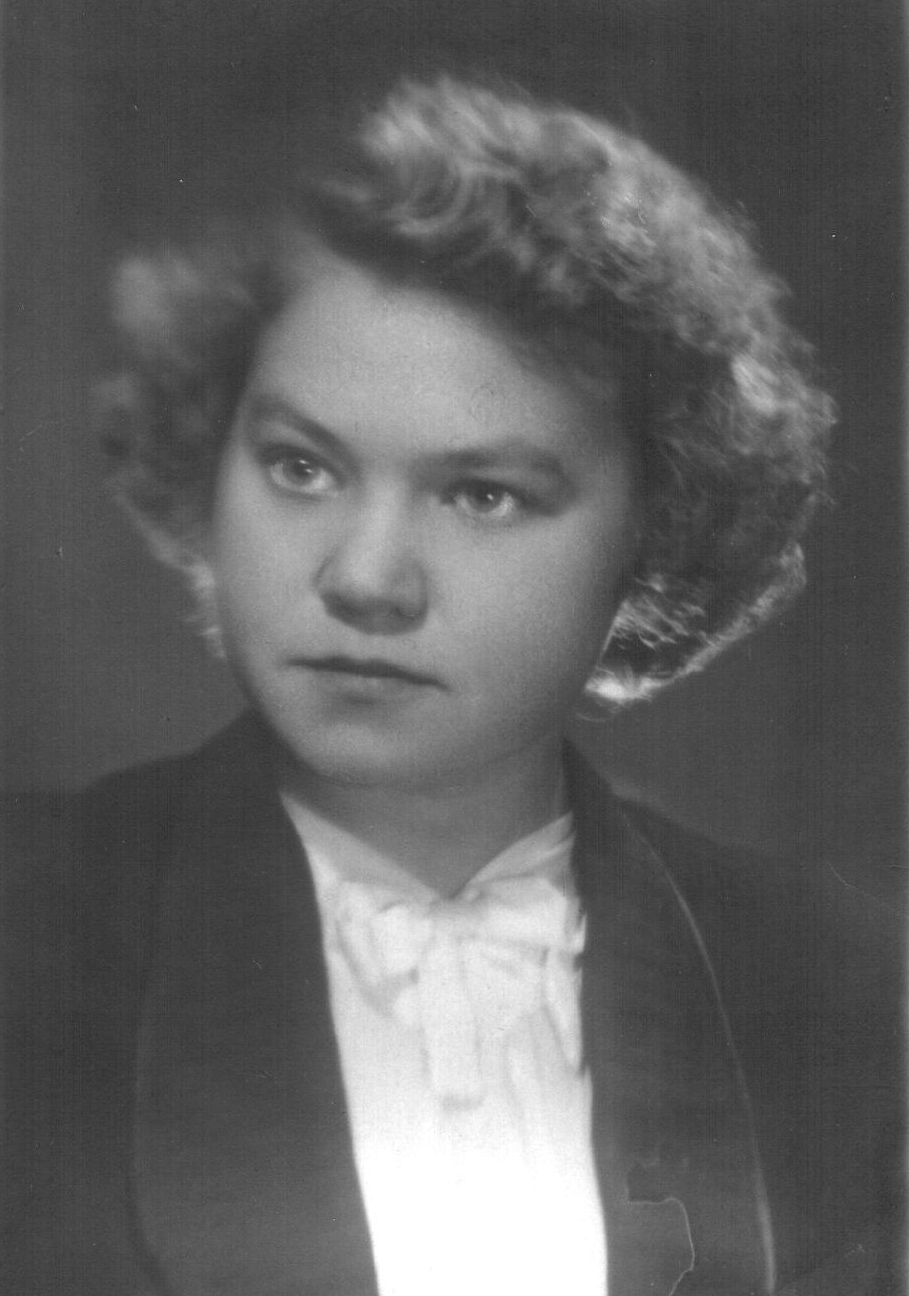
- Born: 25 January 1935; Kyiv, Ukrainian SSR
- Died: October 1, 2010 (aged 75); Kyiv, Ukraine
- Title: professor

Iryna Ivanivna Adamenko (Ukrainian: Ірина Іванівна Адаменко; 25 January 1935, Kyiv — 1 October 2010) was a Ukrainian scientist, Doctor of Physical and Mathematical Sciences, and Professor at the Taras Shevchenko National University of Kyiv.

== Biography ==
Iryna Ivanivna Adamenko was born on 25 January 1935, in Kyiv. In 1957, she graduated from the Faculty of Physics at the Taras Shevchenko National University of Kyiv. She worked at the same university since 1958, starting as a senior research fellow, then an assistant, a senior lecturer, associate professor (1972), professor (1991), and later as a leading research fellow, professor-consultant.

She defended her candidate dissertation on "Study of the relationship between compressibility and viscosity with the structure of molecular liquids" (1964) and her doctoral dissertation on "The influence of pressure on the thermodynamic properties of molecular liquids and their solutions" (1991).

== Scientific activities ==
She was associated with the study of:

- Equations of state, elastic, acoustic, thermal, and calorific properties of molecular liquids and liquid systems.
- Computer modeling of the molecular structure and physical properties of nanoscale liquid systems over a wide range of temperature and pressure changes.
- She discovered regularities in the dependence of the thermodynamic properties of liquids on their molecular structure and recommended an equation of state that not only adequately describes the P-V-T data of molecular liquids but also has first and second derivatives that describe the thermobaric dependencies of thermodynamic properties. She also revealed patterns in the parameters of this equation of state within groups of liquids with similar molecular structures.
- She studied the influence of pressure on the peculiarities of structural transformations and thermobaric dependencies of the physical properties of water and water systems with nanoscale impurities (including glycerin and carbon nano-impurities).
- She lectured on fundamental and special courses for over 40 years, including "Physical Kinetics," "Non-Equilibrium Thermodynamics," "Physics of Liquids," and "Intermolecular Interaction" for students of the Faculty of Physics and a general physics course for students of the Faculty of Geology at the Kyiv University.

Iryna was a member of the specialized council for the protection of doctoral and candidate dissertations and a member of the editorial board of the "Bulletin of Kyiv University. Series: Physical and Mathematical Sciences" journal (included in the list of professional publications of the Higher Attestation Commission of Ukraine).

She also has over 300 scientific papers. A page in the "Encyclopedia of Modern Ukraine" (vol. I, 2001) is dedicated to her.

== Awards ==
- Order of Princess Olga, 3rd class (2009)
- "Excellence in Education of Ukraine" (2000)

== Major scientific works ==
Publications:

- "Physics of Liquids and Liquid Systems". Textbook. Kyiv, 2006 (co-author)
- "Foundations of Rheology". Kyiv National University, 2001.
- "Experimental and Theoretical Methods for Studying the Molecular Structure of Liquids". Kyiv National University, 1998.
- "Experimental Methods in Molecular Physics". Kyiv National University, 1998. Parts I and II.

Articles:

- "The Effect of Pressure on Compressibility and Thermal Expansion of Water Near 320K and in the Range of Pressure from 0.1 MPa to 103.2 MPa" in Chemical Physics (2011)
- "Thermophysical Properties of Carbon Nanotubes in Toluene Under High Pressure" in Journal of Molecular Liquids (2009)
- "Thermodynamic Properties of Glycerol-Water Solution" in Ukrainian Journal of Physics (2007)
- "Equation of State for C60 Fullerene Aqueous Solutions" in International Journal of Thermophysics (2005)
- "Equation of State for C60 Toluene Solution" in Journal of Molecular Liquids (2003)
- "Thermodynamic Properties of C60 Fullerene Water Solution" in High Pressure Research (2003)
- "Self-Organization of C60 Nanoparticles in Toluene Solution" in Journal of Molecular Liquids (2001)
