= Jofish Kaye =

- Born: Joseph Kaye; London, United Kingdom
- Citizenship: British; American
- Education: Massachusetts Institute of Technology (BSc, MSc); Cornell University (PhD)
- Known for: Human-Computer Interaction, digital smell output
- Scientific career
- Theses: Symbolic Olfactory Display (2001); The Epistemology and Evaluation of Experience-focused HCI (2008)
- Doctoral advisor: Phoebe Sengers
- Other academic advisors: Michael Lynch (ethnomethodologist), Jeffrey T. Hancock, Kristina Höök
- Website: www.jofish.com

Jofish Kaye is an American and British scientist specializing in human-computer interaction and artificial intelligence. He is Head of User Experience Research at Inflection AI. Previously, he supported the Innovation Enablement team's research function as principal scientist at Wells Fargo, and ran interaction design and user research teams at anthem.ai and at Mozilla.

== Education ==
Jofish Kaye was born in London and lived in Paris, Singapore, and Tokyo before returning to London. He received a B.S. in brain and cognitive sciences from MIT, followed by a Master in Media Arts & Sciences from the MIT Media Lab where he did work on the internet of things. His masters thesis, Symbolic Olfactory Display, was a pioneer in using digital smell output for information display, where he first characterized the "smicon" or smell icon, in contrast to the "olfactory icon", by analogy to the notion of the phicon introduced by Hiroshi Ishi. He was the first student to come to Cornell to join the Cornell Information Science Ph.D. program, where his advisor was Phoebe Sengers. During his Ph.D, he was a visiting research scientist at Microsoft Research, Cambridge, where he contributed to the evaluation of the Whereabouts Clock, and also interned with Genevieve Bell at Intel. He graduated with his Ph.D. in 2009, where his thesis looked at the evaluation of non-task-focused human-computer interaction

== Professional career ==
After graduating with his Ph.D, he joined Nokia Research in Palo Alto, California, in 2010, where he studied family use of video chat, and worked on using RFID to improve access to clean water supplies in Haiti. In 2012, he was elected vice president at large of ACM SIGCHI. In 2013 he joined Yahoo Labs, where he studied how people think about money, as well as data narratives, the stories people tell about data. He co-chaired the CHI Conference with Allison Druin in 2016. He then joined Mozilla as principal research scientist, where his team built Firefox Voice, an open source smart speaker that ran in the browser. He also ran the Mozilla Research Grant program, funding some 50 research projects over three years. In 2020, he joined anthem.ai, part of Anthem (company), as Senior Director of Interaction Design & Artificial Intelligence. In 2023, he joined Wells Fargo as a principal scientist within the Strategy, Design & Innovation organization; in 2026, he moved to Inflection AI as Head of User Experience Research.

Kaye has a strong interest in promoting diversity in tech, and has served on the ACM Diversity & Inclusion Council.

== Teaching and advising ==
Kaye has taught Stanford University’s CS247 Human-Computer Interaction Studio in 2014 (with John Tang) and 2015 (with six collaborators, 120 students). Jofish also coached and co-taught the Stanford d.School class Designing Liberation Technology in 2013 with Terry Winograd, Josh Cohen, and Zia Yuseff.

== Awards and honors ==
- 2023: ACM Distinguished Member

== Selected works ==
- 2005 - Reflective design. P Sengers, K Boehner, S David, JJ Kaye. Proceedings of the 4th decennial conference on Critical computing
- 2007 - Locating family values: A field trial of the Whereabouts Clock B Brown, AS Taylor, S Izadi, A Sellen, J Jofish’Kaye, R Eardley.
- 2007 - Making love in the network closet: the benefits and work of family video chat. MG Ames, J Go, JJ Kaye, M Spasojevic. International Conference on Ubiquitous Computing, 354-371
- 2019 - Music, search, and IoT: How people (really) use voice assistants. Tawfiq Ammari, Jofish Kaye, Janice Y Tsai, Frank Bentley. ACM Transactions on Computer-Human Interaction (TOCHI) 26 (3)
