= Acylglycerol kinase, mitochondrial =

Protein-coding gene in the species Homo sapiens

AGK

Identifiers
- Aliases: AGK, CATC5, CTRCT38, MTDPS10, MULK, acylglycerol kinase
- External IDs: OMIM: 610345; MGI: 1917173; GeneCards: AGK
Enzyme activity
EC #	BRENDA	ExPASy	KEGG	MetaCyc
2.7.1.94	↗	↗	↗	↗
2.7.1.107	↗	↗	↗	↗
2.7.1.138	↗	↗	↗	↗

Gene location (Human)
Chr.	Chromosome 7 (human)
Band	7q34	Start	141,551,278 bp
Band	7q34	End	141,655,244 bp

Gene location (Mouse)
Chr.	Chromosome 6 (mouse)
Band	6|6 B1	Start	40,302,106 bp
Band	6|6 B1	End	40,373,696 bp
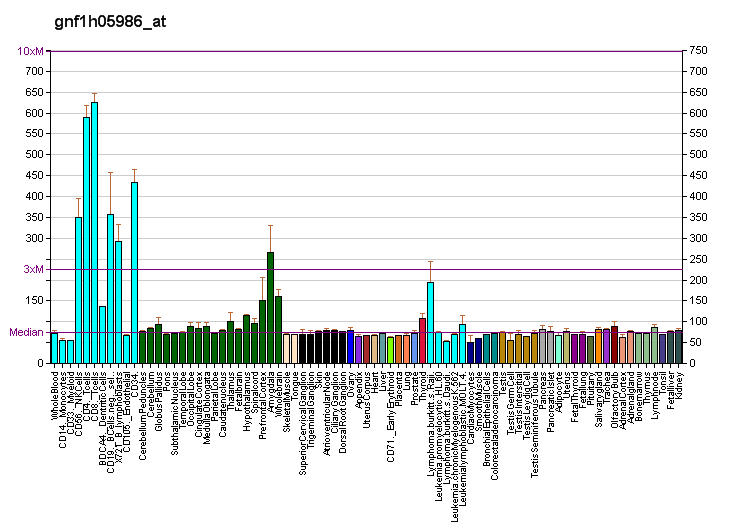

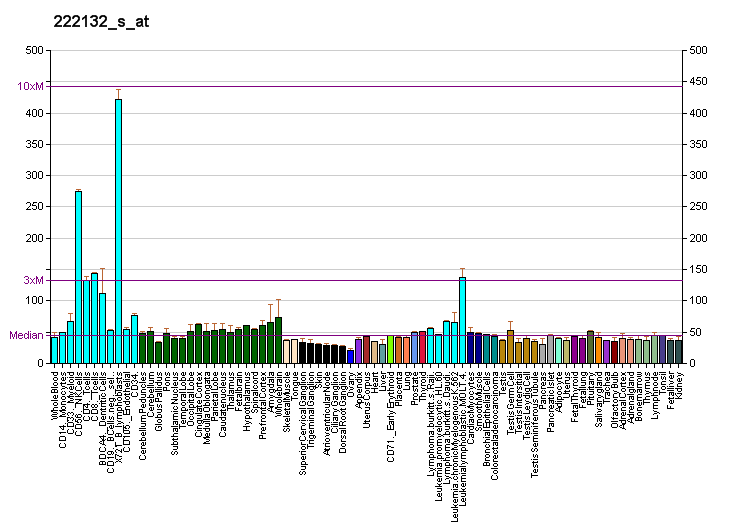

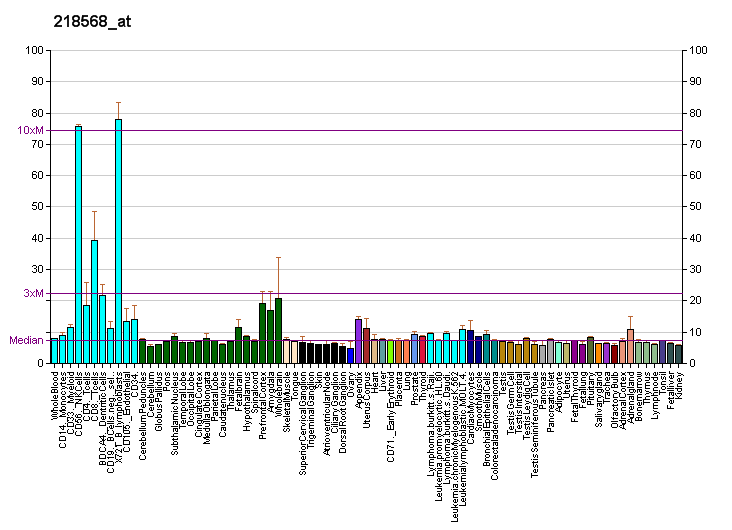
RNA expression pattern
Bgee	Human / Mouse (ortholog); Top expressed in: cerebellar hemisphere; right hemisphere of cerebellum; Brodmann area 9; prefrontal cortex; islet of Langerhans; bone marrow cell; right frontal lobe; epithelium of colon; Achilles tendon; smooth muscle tissue / Top expressed in: zygote; spermatocyte; dentate gyrus of hippocampal formation granule cell; right kidney; yolk sac; tail of embryo; primary visual cortex; superior frontal gyrus; ventricular zone; embryo; More reference expression data
BioGPS	More reference expression data
Gene ontology
Molecular function	transferase activity; ceramide kinase activity; nucleotide binding; lipid kinase activity; diacylglycerol kinase activity; ATP binding; acylglycerol kinase activity; kinase activity; NAD+ kinase activity
Cellular component	mitochondrial outer membrane; intracellular membrane-bounded organelle; mitochondrion; membrane; cytosol; integral component of mitochondrial inner membrane; TIM22 mitochondrial import inner membrane insertion complex; mitochondrial inner membrane; mitochondrial intermembrane space
Biological process	glycerolipid metabolic process; ceramide biosynthetic process; lipid phosphorylation; phosphorylation; metabolism; glycerophospholipid biosynthetic process; protein insertion into mitochondrial inner membrane
Sources:Amigo / QuickGO
Orthologs
Databases	NCBI: entry; OMA: entry
Species	Human	Mouse
Entrez	55750	69923
Ensembl	ENSG00000006530; ENSG00000262327	ENSMUSG00000029916
UniProt	Q53H12	Q9ESW4
RefSeq (mRNA)	NM_018238; NM_001364948	NM_023538
RefSeq (protein)	NP_060708	NP_076027
Location (UCSC)	Chr 7: 141.55 – 141.66 Mb	Chr 6: 40.3 – 40.37 Mb
PubMed search
- Wikidata
View/Edit Human	View/Edit Mouse

acylglycerol kinase

Identifiers
- EC no.: 2.7.1.94
- CAS no.: 62213-37-0

Databases
- BRENDA: enzyme data
- ExPASy: NiceZyme view
- KEGG: enzyme entry
- MetaCyc: metabolic pathway
- Rhea: reactions
- PDB structures: RCSB PDB PDBe PDBsum
- Gene Ontology: AmiGO / QuickGO
Search
- PMC: articles
- PubMed: articles
- NCBI: proteins

Acylglycerol kinase (EC 2.7.1.94) is an enzyme encoded in humans by the AGK gene. This enzyme belongs to the family of transferases, specifically those transferring phosphorus-containing groups (phosphotransferases) with an alcohol group as acceptor. The systematic name of this enzyme class is ATP:acylglycerol 3-phosphotransferase. Other names in common use include monoacylglycerol kinase, monoacylglycerol kinase (phosphorylating), sn-2-monoacylglycerol kinase, MGK, monoglyceride kinase, and monoglyceride phosphokinase. This enzyme participates in glycerolipid metabolism.

The protein encoded by this gene is a mitochondrial membrane protein involved in lipid and glycerolipid metabolism. It catalyzes the formation of phosphatidic and lysophosphatidic acids. Defects in this gene have been associated with mitochondrial DNA depletion syndrome 10.

Diseases associated with AGK include cataracts and cardiomyopathy. An important paralog of this gene is CERKL.

== Structure ==
The AGK gene is located on the 7th chromosome, with its specific location being 7q34. The gene contains 18 exons. AGK encodes a 47.1 kDa protein that is composed of 422 amino acids; 32 peptides have been observed through mass spectrometry data.

== Function ==
Acylglycerol kinase synthesizes phosphatidic and lysophosphatidic acids. The enzyme uses ATP to put a phosphate group on acyl glycerol and diacylglycerol. It catalyzes the following reactions:

ATP + acylglycerol = ADP + acyl-sn-glycerol 3-phosphate. ATP + 1,2-diacyl-sn-glycerol = ADP + 1,2-diacyl-sn-glycerol 3-phosphate.

The enzyme is involved in the more general pathway of fatty acid metabolism. AGK also has an implicated role in the assembly of the adenine nucleotide translocator in the inner mitochondrial membrane.

== Clinical significance ==
Mutations in the AGK gene were the first to be implicated in isolated cataract development, although it is unclear whether these mutations cause a change in lipid composition of the lenses, or if signaling results in the defect. This gene has also been associated with Sengers syndrome. Two different phenotypes have been observed. One form of the disorder presented as vascular strokes, lactic acidosis, cardiomyopathy and cataracts, abnormal muscle cell histopathology and mitochondrial function. In those patients, there was also a markedly high rate of citrate synthase. The second phenotype presented with similar clinical symptoms, but no strokes. As phosphatidic acid is also involved in the synthesis of phospholipids, its loss will result in changes to the lipid composition of the inner mitochondrial membrane. These effects manifest as cataract formation in the eye, respiratory chain dysfunction and cardiac hypertrophy in heart tissue.

AGK expression has also been correlated with certain cancer phenotypes. AGK expression, in coordination with AGX, was not detected in non-neoplastic epithelia, while both were weakly expressed in the majority of high-grade intra-epithelial neoplasia (HG-PIN). Expressions of both enzymes were significantly correlated with primary Gleason grade of cancer foci and capsular invasion. Overexpression of AGK sustains constitutive JAK2/STAT3 activation, consequently promoting the cancer stem cell population and augmenting the tumorigenicity of esophageal squamous cell carcinoma (ESCC) cells both in vivo and in vitro. Furthermore, AGK levels significantly increases STAT3 phosphorylation, poorer disease-free survival, and shorter overall survival in primary ESCC. More importantly, AGK expression was significantly correlated with JAK2/STAT3 hyperactivation in ESCC, as well as in lung and breast cancer. In prostate cancer, AGK expression amplifies EGF signaling pathways, thus playing a significant role in the development of prostate cancer. It's also correlated tumor-nodule-metastasis (TNM) classification breast cancer, and an overall shorter overall survival.

== Interactions ==
In the progression of diabetic retinopathy, the ATX-AGK-LPA signaling axis plays a significant role.

In the proliferation of prostate cancer, AGK interacts with and regulates PC-3 prostate cancer cells markedly increased formation and secretion of LPA. This increase also affects the EGF receptor and sustained activation of extracellular signal related kinase (ERK) 1/2, culminating in enhanced cell proliferation. Acylglycerol kinase also augments JAK2/STAT3 signaling in esophageal squamous cells.
