= John Assael =

British architect (born 1950)

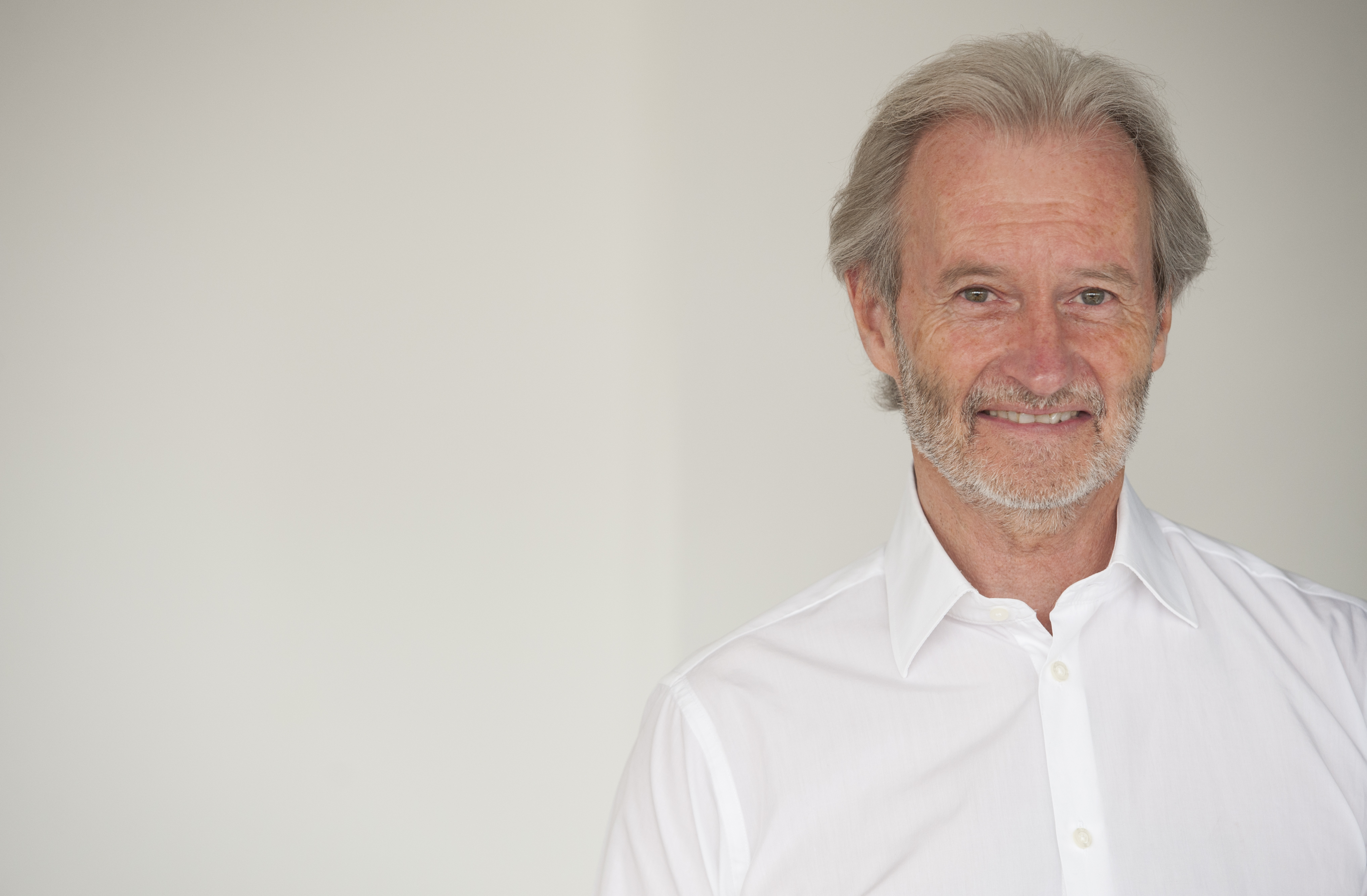
- Born: 1950 (age 75–76); Nairobi, Kenya
- Education: Oxford Brookes University School of Architecture; University of London; Architectural Association School of Architecture
- Occupation: Architect
- Practice: Assael Architecture
- Projects: Great Northern Tower, Manchester; Great West Quarter, Brentford; Century Buildings, Manchester; Riverside Studios, Hammersmith
- Website: www.assael.co.uk

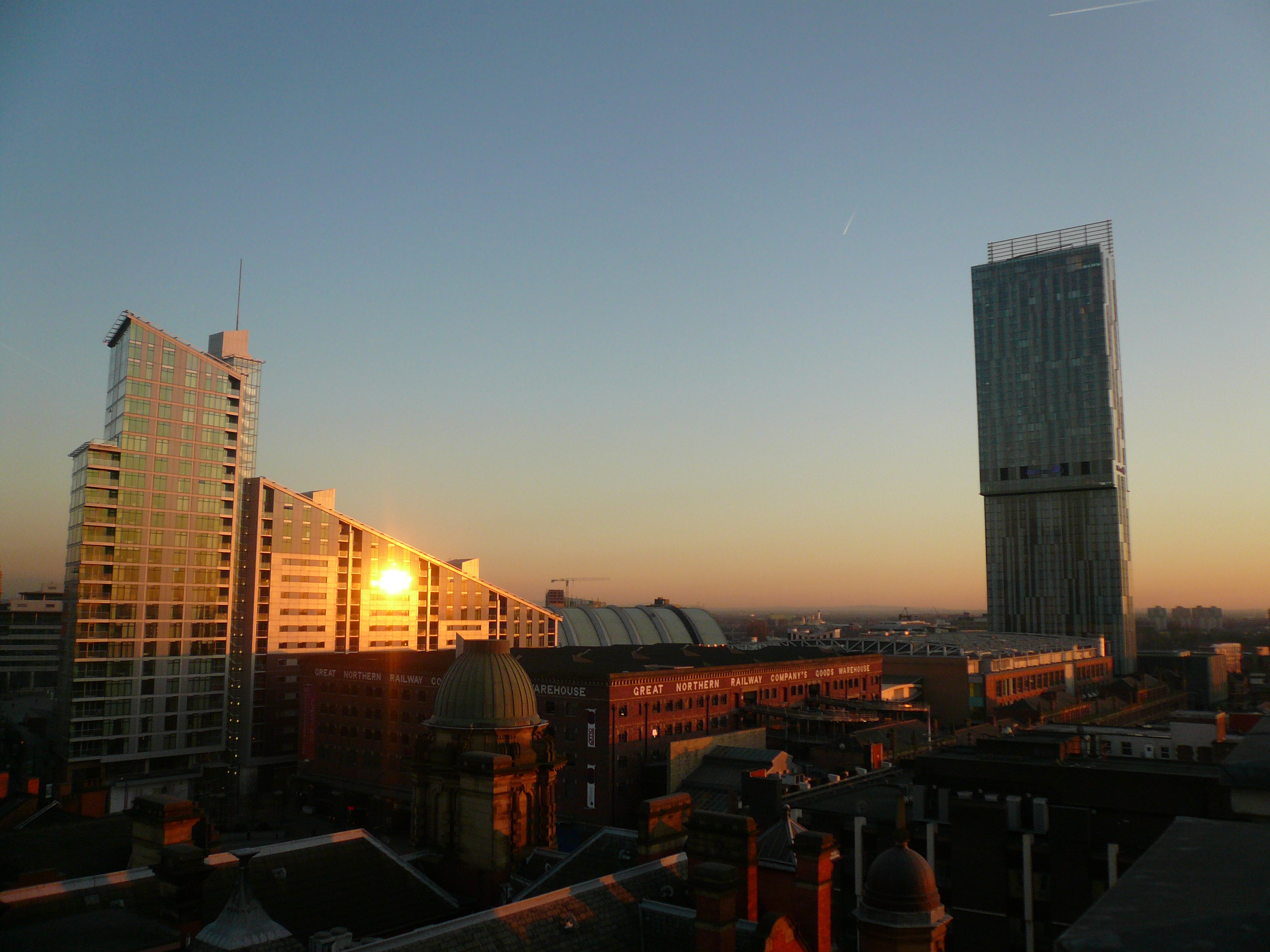
Great Northern Tower, Manchester

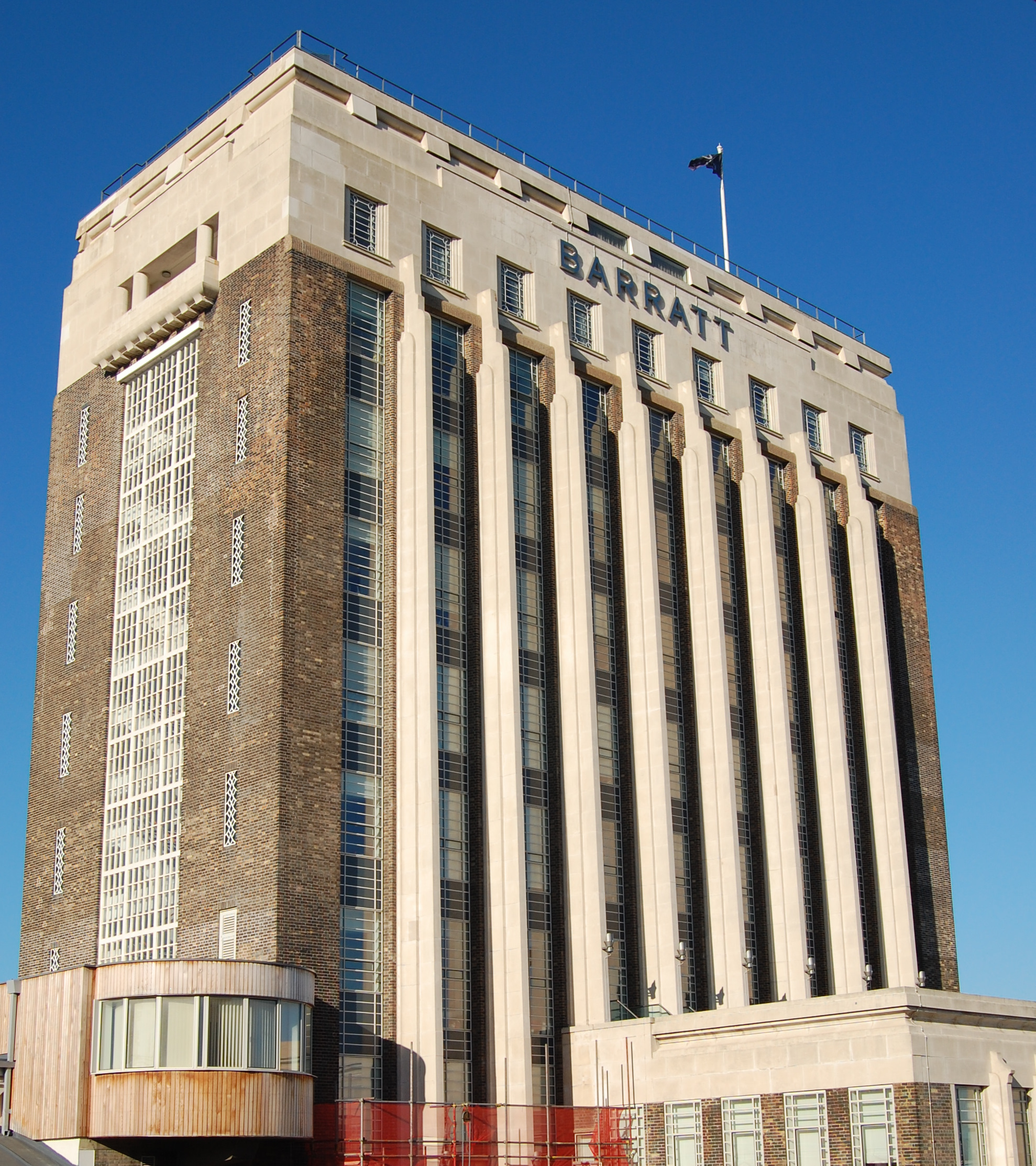
Wallis House, Brentford, London

John Assael FRIBA FRSA (born 1950) is a prominent British architect. He is particularly known for his work at the Royal Institute of British Architects (RIBA) and for his commitment to being an exemplar employer.

== Early life and education ==
John Assael was born in Nairobi in Kenya. He spent the early years of his life in Africa but attended school in England from the age of 11.

He studied architecture at Oxford Polytechnic, which renamed in 1992 to Oxford Brookes University. He has a Master's degree in Urban & Regional Planning from the University of London. He also holds a Post Graduate Diploma from the Architectural Association School of Architecture in Conservation Studies.

In 2017 he was awarded an Honorary Doctor of Design by Oxford Brookes University and in 2023 was made an Honorary Professor by the University of Nottingham.

== Career ==
John Assael is currently the Chairman and a co-founder of the London-based practice Assael Architecture.

=== Architecture ===
After qualifying as an Architect, he worked for several architectural companies until the age of 28, when he started his first practice. In 1994 he founded the London-based practice Assael Architecture along with co-founder Russell Pedley. His practice was named Architect of the Year in 2016 at The Sunday Times British Homes Awards.

=== Professional ===
In 2019 he was made a Fellow of the Royal Institute of British Architects (RIBA). In 2014 he had been elected to act as a national member of the RIBA Council, the governing body of the RIBA and was later appointed as Honorary Treasurer. He had previously held various other posts at the RIBA, including Vice President for Professional Services and was a trustee of the RIBA Board. He is a former chairman of the RIBA Journal.

He was an elected member to the Architect's Registration Board (ARB) where he has sat on the Prescription Committee.

He is a co-opted member of the Council of the Association of Consultant Architects.

He sits on the Executive Committee and has been a trustee of the Architects Benevolent Society since 2004. and was a judge for the annual WAN (World Architecture News) Awards.

=== Involvement in Higher Education ===
He been a visiting fellow at Oxford Brookes University since 2000. He is an external examiner at The Bartlett and London Metropolitan University and has lectured at Cardiff, Nottingham, Huddersfield, Manchester and Westminster Universities.

He holds the post of Master of Students at the Worshipful Company of Chartered Architects

== Notable work ==
- 21 Young Street
- Queen's Wharf & Riverside Studios, Hammersmith
- Great West Quarter, Brentford
- Century Buildings, Manchester
- Wallis House - conversion of Art Deco landmark on the Golden Mile, Brentford, London.
- Ten Rochester Row
- Tachbrook Triangle SW1, Vauxhall Bridge Road, London
- Rainsborough Square, Farm Lane, Fulham
- Osiers Gate
- Lumiere Apartments, Former Granada Cinema, Clapham
- Paynes and Borthwick Wharves, London
- Quebec Way, Canada Water, London
- Doddington Estate, Cheshire

== Selected awards ==
- The Sunday Times British Homes Awards, Architect of the Year in 2008, 2014 and 2016
- Building magazine's Good Employer Guide, Winner 2014 and 2015
- Architects' Journal AJ120 Business Pioneer of the Year in 2015
