= Michael Moldover =

American physicist (1940–2025)

- Born: 19 July 1940; New York City
- Died: 8 August 2025 (aged 85)
- Education: Stanford University (MS, PhD) Rensselaer Polytechnic Institute (BS) Bronx High School of Science
- Occupation: Physicist
- Employer(s): U.S. National Institute of Standards and Technology, University of Minnesota
- Known for: Acoustic thermometry, Microgravity, Pressure standards

Michael Robert Moldover (19 July 1940 – 8 August 2025) was an American physicist and scientific researcher who is regarded as one of the founders of modern acoustic thermometry. For the majority of his career, he worked with the United States National Institute of Standards and Technology, where he served as a NIST Fellow and leader of NIST's Fluid Metrology Group. His work focused on topics including thermometry, microgravity, pressure standards, and measurement of universal gas constants. He is credited with innovations in the field of temperature measurements which led to the 2019 redefinition of the kelvin. Experiments resulting from his research and publications were carried into space on American space shuttles in 1992, 1994, 1997, and 2003.

== Education and early career ==
Moldover was born in New York City and attended the Bronx High School of Science. He earned a BS in physics from Rensselaer Polytechnic Institute in 1961. At Stanford University, he earned an MS in 1962 and PhD in 1966. Moldover taught as an assistant professor at the University of Minnesota beginning in 1966; his work there focused on heat measurements near Critical points of helium.

In 1972, he joined the United States National Bureau of Standards (which changed its name to NIST in 1988). In 1979, an article on which he was lead author was published in Reviews of Modern Physics; it was later described by microgravity researchers as the 'bible' on gravity effects near the critical point.

== Research and discoveries ==
Moldover's work led to groundbreaking discoveries in the field of metrology. In 1988, he authored a paper that defined the Boltzmann constant (the relationship between the average kinetic energy of molecules and temperature) more precisely than had ever been previously calculated. The experiment that led to this discovery included Moldover running sound waves through a sphere of argon gas and measuring their speed. In 2019, the new value of the Boltzmann constant Moldover discovered was used as the basis for the official redefinition of the kelvin.

Moldover is widely regarded as a pioneer in the field of acoustic thermometry, the use of sound to measure temperature in gasses, liquids, and solids. Experiments and applications based on Moldover's discoveries include the 2025 real-time atmospheric measurements of temperature at altitudes of over 5,000 meters using an acoustic thermometer.

== Awards ==
The Washington Academy of Sciences gave Moldover an award for accomplishments in the physical sciences in 1990.

In 1993, the American Physical Society named him a Fellow for his "outstanding experimental contributions in critical phenomena, interfacial phenomena and acoustic metrology, including a more accurate determination of the universal gas constant."

The American Society of Mechanical Engineers awarded Moldover the Yeram S. Touloukian Award for his "fundamental achievements in thermometry, pressure standards, and landmark measurement of universal gas constants; for advances in state-of-the art of thermophysical property measurements including development of spherical resonators, integration of measurements with theory, and elucidation of critical region behavior."

In 2021, the Acoustical Society of America awarded Moldover the Helmholtz-Rayleigh Interdisciplinary Silver Medal in Physical Acoustics and Engineering Acoustics. He received the prize for "establishing spherical acoustic resonators as the foundation of the kelvin in the International System of Units."

== Death ==
Moldover died on 8 August 2025.
