= Renaissance, Lewisham =

Housing development in the London Borough of Lewisham, England

Coordinates: 51.46433°N 0.01555°W

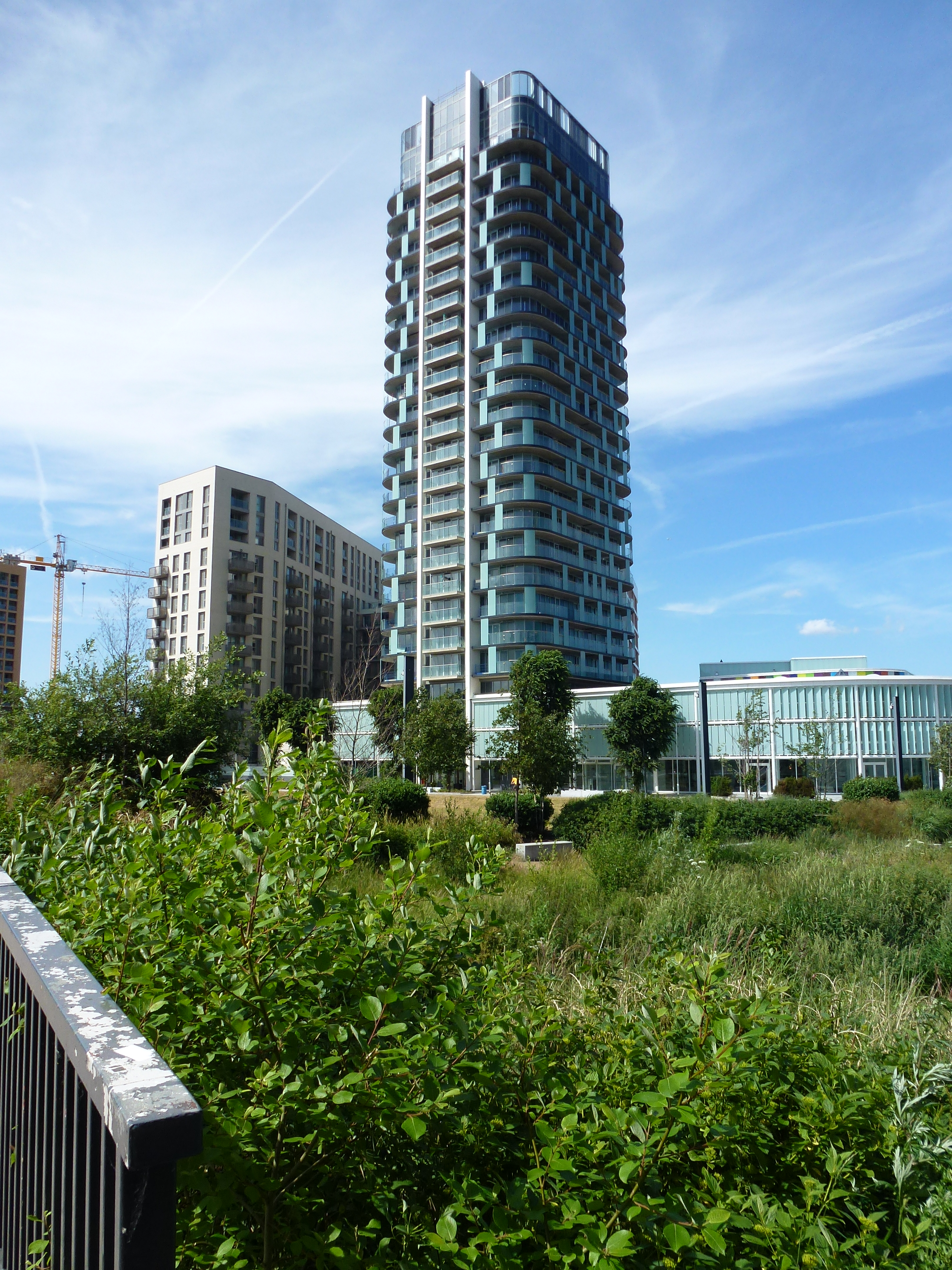
Renaissance, Lewisham SE13

Renaissance is a mixed-use development designed by Assael Architecture and commissioned by Barratt Homes in Lewisham, Greater London comprising 788 flats in 10 buildings, retail units at ground level, a district heating centre and the Glass Mill leisure centre designed by LA Architects.

== History ==
The development is located to the south of Loampit Vale, on the site of the former 1960s Sundermead Estate. Lewisham Council approved its demolition and redevelopment in 2009.

== Development ==
The scheme has a complementary mix of uses. The residential buildings have Italian-inspired names: Torre Vista, Venice Corte, Sienna Alto, Da Vinci Torre, Rome/Roma Corte, Tuscany Corte, and Paris Corte.

Glass Mill Leisure Centre replaces Ladywell Leisure Centre.
