= Assael Architecture =

British architectural firm

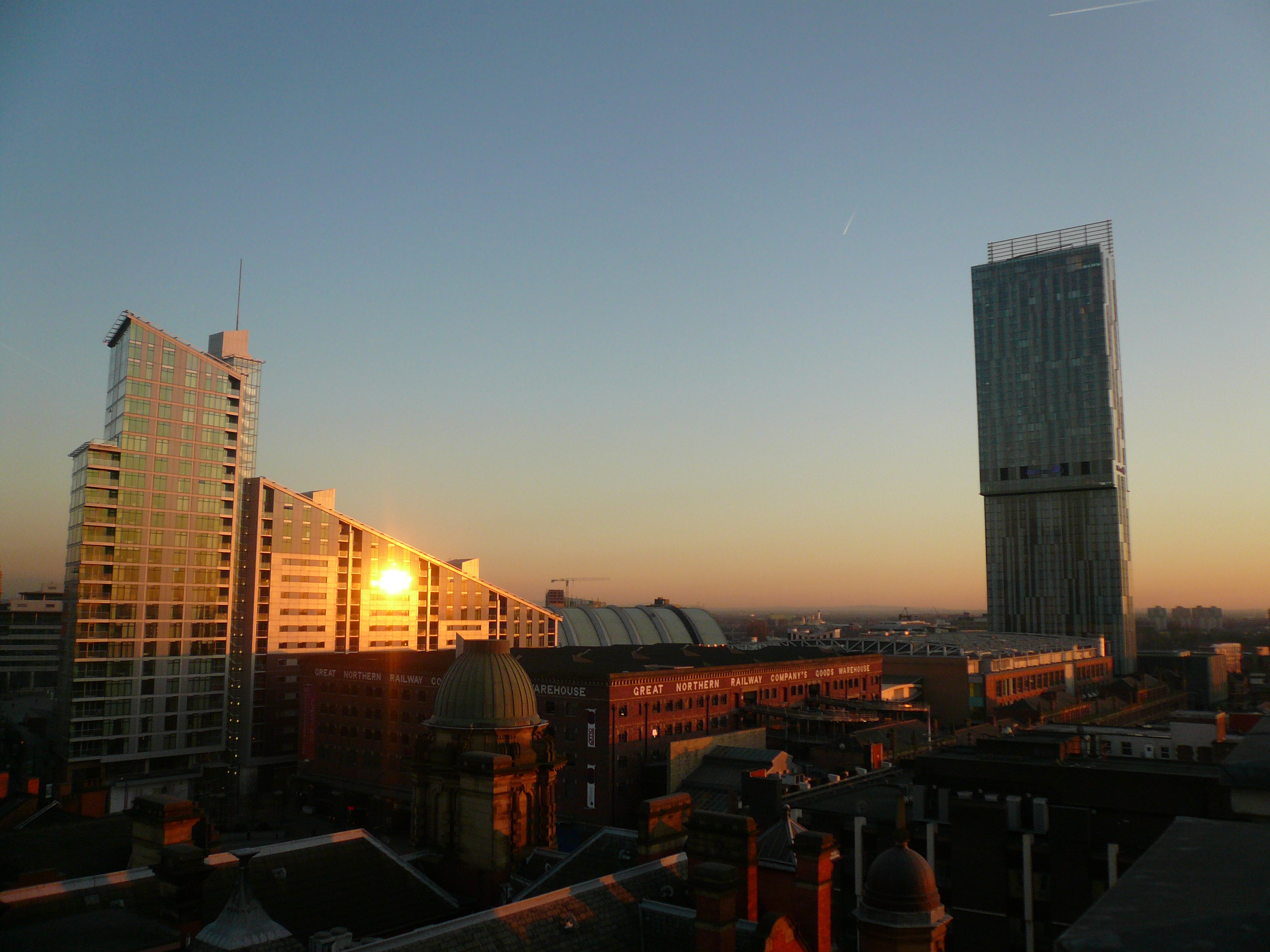
Sunset on the Great Northern Tower, Manchester

Assael Architecture is a British architectural firm based in London, established in 1994.

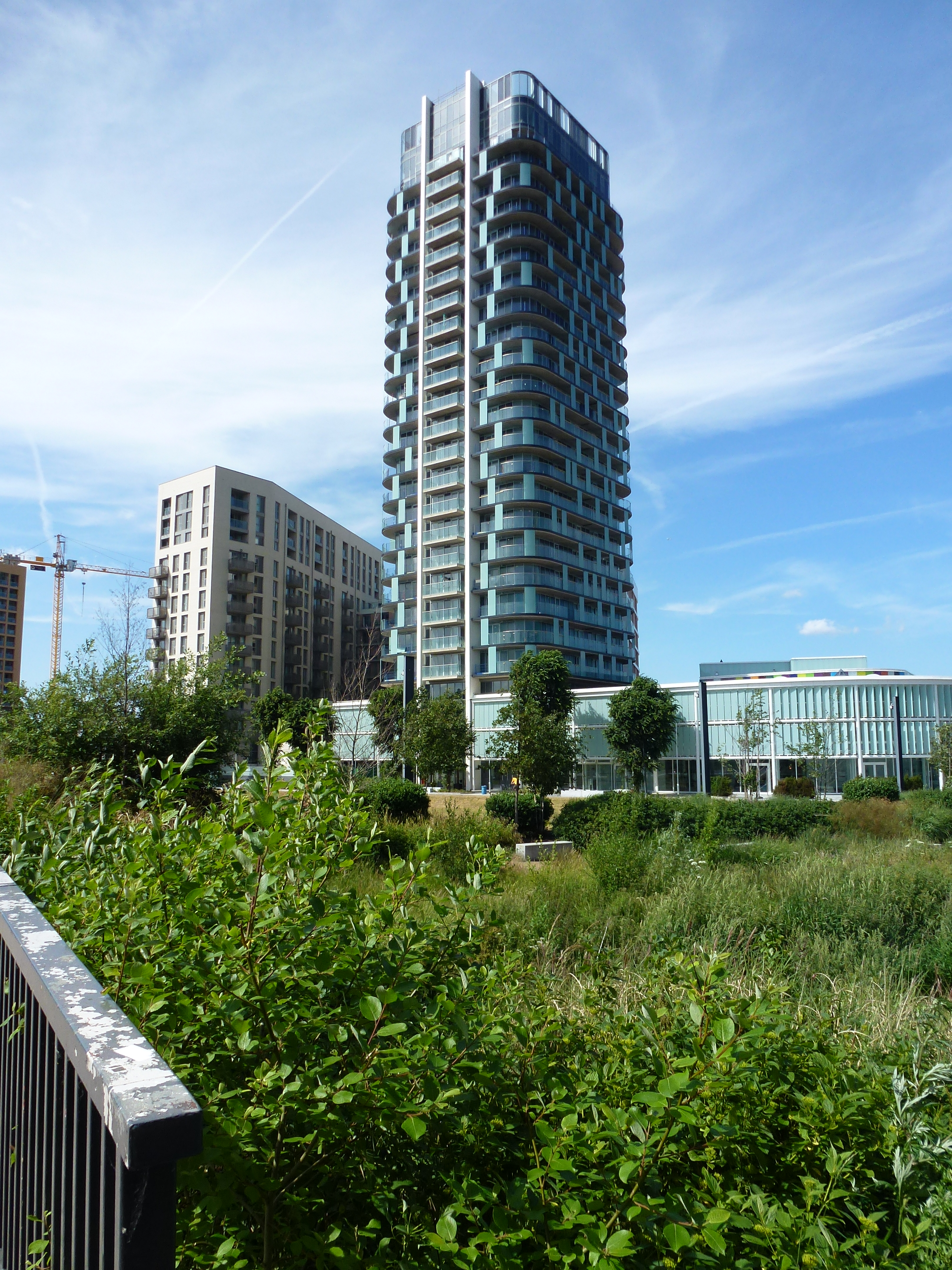
Renaissance, Lewisham, London

== Background ==
Assael Architecture was established in 1994, co-founded and owned by John Assael and Russell Pedley. Registered in the United Kingdom and a RIBA chartered practice. The firm's principal studios are located in London with a licensed studio in Bahrain. It is a member of the AJ100, consisting of the 100 largest architecture practices in the UK and ranked by the Architects' Journal in 2016 as the 70th largest practice in Britain. Notable buildings include the Great Northern Tower in Manchester, and the Tachbrook Triangle on Vauxhall Bridge Road, Westminster, London which won a RIBA Housing Design Award in 2007.

== Notable buildings ==
- Great Northern Tower, Manchester
- Tachbrook Triangle, Vauxhall Bridge Road, London. Housing Design Awards
- Rochester Row, London. Building-for-Life Award 2010 - Gold Standard
- Wallis House, Great West Quarter, London
- Renaissance, Lewisham, London.
- Macaulay Walk, Clapham, London
- Creekside Wharf, Greenwich, London

== Awards ==
- Architect of the Year 2016, The Sunday Times British Homes Awards
- Best Housing Project 2016 for Battersea Square, The Sunday Times British Homes Awards
- AJ120 2015 winner of Business Pioneer of the Year
- Building Magazine's Good Employer Guide Winner 2014 and 2015
- Housing Design Award 2014, Project winner Private Rented Sector (PRS) for Young Street, Kensington & Chelsea, London
- Cabe Building for Life Award 2010, Gold Standard for Rochester Row, Westminster, London
