= Laser-induced incandescence =

Laser-induced incandescence (LII) is an in situ method of measuring aerosol particle volume fraction, primary particle sizes, and other thermophysical properties in flames, during gas-phase nanoparticle synthesis, and in aerosol streams more broadly. The technique is prominently used to characterize soot.

The technique can broadly be separated into applications involving continuous or pulsed laser sources, with the former implemented in the Single Particle Soot Photometer (SP2) and the latter used in time-resolved laser-induced incandescence (TiRe-LII) analyses.

== See also ==
- Laser-induced fluorescence
- Planar laser-induced fluorescence
