= Thermophotonics =

Concept to generate usable power from the heat

Thermophotonics (often abbreviated as TPX) is a concept for generating usable power from heat which shares some features of thermophotovoltaic (TPV) power generation. Thermophotonics was first publicly proposed by solar photovoltaic researcher Martin Green in 2000. However, no TPX device is known to have been demonstrated to date, apparently because of the stringent requirement on the emitter efficiency.

A TPX system consists of a light-emitting diode (LED) (though other types of emitters are conceivable), a photovoltaic (PV) cell, an optical coupling between the two, and an electronic control circuit. The LED is heated to a temperature higher than the PV temperature by an external heat source. If no power is applied to the LED, the system functions much like a very inefficient TPV system, but if a forward bias is applied at some fraction of the bandgap potential, an increased number of electron-hole pairs (EHPs) will be thermally excited to the bandgap energy. These EHPs can then recombine radiatively so that the LED emits light at a rate higher than the thermal radiation rate ("superthermal" emission). This light is then delivered to the cooler PV cell over the optical coupling and converted to electricity.

The control circuit presents a load to the PV cell (presumably at the maximum power point) and converts this voltage to a voltage level that can be used to sustain the bias of the emitter. Provided that the conversion efficiencies of electricity to light and light to electricity are sufficiently high, the power harnessed from the PV cell can exceed the power going into the bias circuit, and this small fraction of excess power (originating from the heat difference) can be utilized. It is thus in some sense a photonic heat engine.

Possible applications of thermophotonic generators include solar thermal electricity generation and utilization of waste heat. TPX systems may have the potential to generate power with useful levels of output at temperatures where only thermoelectric systems are now practical, but with higher efficiency.

A patent application for a thermophotonic generator using a vacuum gap with thickness on the order of a micrometer or less was published by the US Patent Office in 2009 and assigned to MTPV Corporation of Austin, Texas, USA. This proposed variant of the technology allows better thermal insulation because of the gap between the hot emitter and cold receiver, while maintaining relatively good optical coupling between them due to the gap's being small relative to the optical wavelength.
