= Filtered Rayleigh scattering =

Filtered Rayleigh scattering (FRS) is a diagnostic technique which measures velocity, temperature, and pressure by determining Doppler shift, total intensity, and spectral line shape of laser induced Rayleigh-Brillouin scattering.
