= Marc J. Assael =

Greek chemical engineer

- Born: 5 August 1954 (age 72); Thessaloniki, Central Macedonia, Greece
- Scientific career
- Fields: Thermophysical Properties
- Workplaces: Aristotle University of Thessaloniki, Xi’an Jiaotong University, Keio University
- Doctoral advisor: Bill Wakeham

Marc J. Assael (born 5 August 1954) is a Greek Chemical Engineer and a professor of Thermophysical Properties.

== Career ==
From 1995 to 1997 he was the Head of the Department of Chemical Engineering at Aristotle University of Thessaloniki, Greece, where he currently holds the position of Professor of Thermophysical Properties. In 1998 he was TEPCO Chair Visiting Chair in Keio University, Tokyo, Japan, and during 2007-2011 he was adjunct professor in Xi’an Jiaotong University, P.R. China. He is currently the Secretary of the International Association for Transport Properties, the Secretary of the International Organization Committee of the European Conference on Thermophysical Properties, and a Fellow of the International Thermal Conductivity Conferences (FITCc). In 2023, during the 22nd European Conference on Thermophysical Properties, Prof. Marc J. Assael was honored with the Lifetime Achievements Award, for his longstanding and distinguished contributions to the field of thermophysics.

He is Editor-in-Chief of the Springer-Nature International Journal of Thermophysics, Editor of Old City Publishing High Temperatures - High Pressures journal, Guest Editor of Elsevier Education for Chemical Engineers and of the Praise Worthy Prize International Review of Chemical Engineering journal.

== Education ==
He received his BSc, MSc and PhD degrees in Chemical Engineering from Imperial College London.

== Published work ==
Assael has authored and co-authored about 200 scientific publications in the field of Thermophysical Properties. Most cited books:

- Assael M.J., Trusler J.M.P., and Tsolakis Th.F., "Thermophysical Properties of Fluids. An Introduction to their Prediction", Imperial College Press, London, U.K. (1996).
- Assael M.J. and Kakosimos K.E., “Fires, Explosions and Toxic Gas Dispersions: Effects Calculation and Risk Analysis”, CRC Press., Boca Raton, U.S.A. (2010).
- Assael M.J., Wakeham W.A., Goodwin A.R.H., Will S., Stamatoudis M., "Commonly Asked Questions in Thermodynamics", CRC Press., Boca Raton, U.S.A. (2011).
- Assael M.J., Goodwin A.R.H., Vesovic V. and Wakeham W.A. Eds., “Experimental Thermodynamics Volume IX: Advances in Transport Properties of Fluids”, RSC Press., London U.K. (2014).
