= Sengers syndrome =

Senger's syndrome
- Other names: Congenital cataract-hypertrophic cardiomyopathy-mitochondrial myopathy syndrome, Cardiomyopathy and cataract.
- Autosomal recessive pattern is the inheritance manner of this condition
- Symptoms: Cataracts, fatigue, muscle weakness, hypotonia, lactic acidosis, and cardiomyopathy.
- Usual onset: Birth
- Causes: Mutations in the AGK and SLC25A4 genes.
- Frequency: Rare

Sengers syndrome is a rare autosomal recessive mitochondrial disease characterised by congenital cataract, hypertrophic cardiomyopathy, muscle weakness and lactic acidosis after exercise. Biallelic pathogenic mutations in the AGK gene, which encodes the acylglycerol kinase enzyme, cause Sengers syndrome. In addition, heart disease and muscle disease are prevalent, meaning that life expectancy is short for many patients.

== Signs and symptoms ==
Cataracts often develop shortly after birth or at the time of birth. It may be necessary to have early surgery if they are dense enough to impair vision. Despite this, visual rehabilitation is less than ideal since vision is rarely normal and many children attend special schools for the blind.

Additionally, skeletal muscles and the heart become weak because of this disorder. Common symptoms include fatigue, muscle weakness, and floppiness (hypotonia). It is often seen following exercise that you develop lactic acidosis, which is a medical condition that requires prompt treatment. A thickened heart muscle impairs its pumping ability (hypertrophic cardiomyopathy). The generalized muscle weakness can cause motor development to be delayed, despite normal intelligence.

== Genetics ==
This disease is caused by mutations in AGK or SLC25A4 genes. The AGK gene encodes the mitochondrial acylglycerol kinase which plays a role in the assembly of adenine nucleotide translocator. The SLC25A4 gene encodes the heart and muscle-specific isoform 1 of the mitochondrial adenine nucleotide translocator.

In 2025, a pathogenic variant in TIMM29 gene, encoding Tim29 protein, is identified as an other cause of Sengers syndrome. AGK and Tim29 proteins are components of the same TIM22 complex.

== Diagnosis ==
The diagnosis may be provisionally made on clinical grounds. Ophthalmologists, neurologists, cardiologists, and pediatricians are some of the specialists who can make the diagnosis. Because of the widespread impact of the disease, it is most likely to be a collaborative effort. Acute lactic acidosis and heart disease are the greatest threats to life and must be treated promptly. Yet, more than half of newborns die before they reach their second birthday, and some live a decade or more. In terms of severity, there is a considerable range. Further diagnostic tests include serum and urine analysis for lactic acid, a chest X-ray (or cardiac CT or MRI) and echocardiography. Biopsies from cardiac and skeletal muscle will show the presence of lipid and glycogen. Testing for mitochondrial abnormalities, ANT deficiency, and decreases of respiratory chain complexes I and IV can also be done.

=== Differential diagnosis ===
- Isolated ATP synthase deficiency
- Barth syndrome
- TMEM70 deficiency

== Treatment ==
Surgery for cataracts may be needed. Medical treatment for cardiac failure will be required. Treatment is otherwise supportive.

== Prognosis ==
About half the patients die within the first year of life. Because of its rarity, the prognosis for the chronic form is not well established but survival into adulthood has been reported.

== Epidemiology ==
Sengers syndrome is a rare disorder. About 40 cases have been reported worldwide.

== History ==
This condition was first described in 1975.
