= Anneke Levelt Sengers =

Dutch physicist (1929–2024)

- Born: 4 March 1929; Amsterdam, Netherlands
- Died: 28 February 2024 (aged 94); Gaithersburg, Maryland, U.S.
- Other name: Johanna Levelt Sengers
- Education: University of Amsterdam
- Spouse: Jan Vincent Sengers
- Children: four
- Scientific career
- Fields: Physics
- Workplaces: NIST

Johanna Maria Henrica (Anneke) Levelt Sengers (4 March 1929 – 28 February 2024) was a Dutch physicist known for her work on critical states of fluids. She retired from the National Institute of Standards and Technology (NIST) in 1994, after a 31 year career there. In 2005 Levelt Sengers was co-chair (with Dr Manju Sharma) for the InterAcademy Council of the advisory report 'Women for Science' published June 2006. She co-chaired the InterAmerican Network of Academies of Sciences women for science program.

== Education and career ==
Levelt Sengers was born on 4 March 1929 in Amsterdam, Netherlands. Her father was a chemist and her mother had studied physics. She was the eldest child and had nine siblings. During World War II her father spent time in Buchenwald concentration camp.

Levelt Sengers started studying physics at the University of Amsterdam in 1947. She earned her candidaats (Bachelor of Science) in physics and chemistry from the University of Amsterdam in 1950, a Master of Science there in 1954 and completed her Ph.D. from the same university in 1958. Her dissertation, Measurements of the Compressibility of Argon in the Gaseous and Liquid Phase, was jointly promoted by Antonius M. J. F. Michels and Jan de Boer.

She emigrated to the United States in 1963 and joined the National Bureau of Standards (later renamed to NIST).

== Awards and honors ==
In 1990, Levelt Sengers became a corresponding member of the Royal Netherlands Academy of Arts and Sciences. In 1992, Delft University of Technology gave her an honorary doctorate. She was a fellow of the American Society of Mechanical Engineers, the American Physical Society, and the American Association for the Advancement of Science, and a member of the National Academy of Engineering and National Academy of Sciences. She was the L'Oréal-UNESCO Award for Women in Science 2003 Laureate for North America, and the 2006 winner of the ASME Yeram S. Touloukian Award. In 2015, the IANAS Women for Science Program announced an award for young women scientists would be named the Anneke Levelt-Senger Prize (sic) in her honor.

== Personal life and death ==
Anneke Levelt Sengers married physicist Jan V. Sengers in 1962; their four children include computer scientist and ethnographer Phoebe Sengers. In 1975 she and her husband became naturalized US citizens.

Levelt Sengers died on 28 February 2024, a week shy of her 95th birthday.
