= Great Northern Tower =

High-rise building in Manchester, England

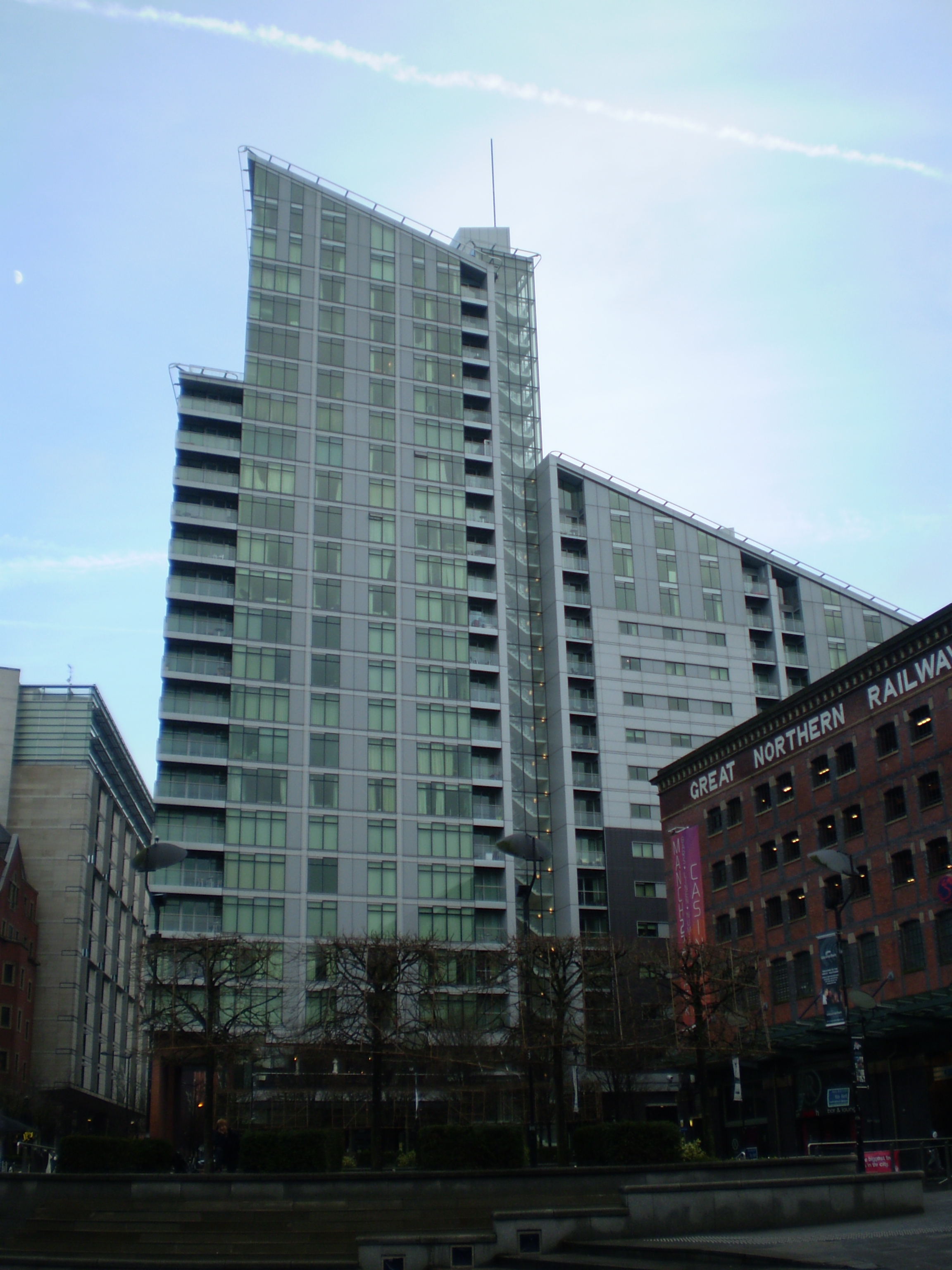
- Great Northern Tower, Manchester
- Interactive map of the Great Northern Tower area

General information
- Status: Completed
- Type: High-rise
- Architectural style: Post modern
- Location: Watson Street, Manchester, England
- Coordinates: 53.4776°N 2.2480°W
- Construction started: 2004
- Completed: 2007

Height
- Height: 72 m (236 ft)

Technical details
- Floor count: 25
- Floor area: 25,700 m^{2} (277,000 sq ft)

Design and construction
- Architect: Assael Architecture
- Developer: George Wimpey City (now Taylor Wimpey)
- Main contractor: Carillion

Other information
- Number of units: 257

The Great Northern Tower is a 72-metre (236 ft) sloped high-rise apartment building located on Watson Street in Manchester city centre, England. It is adjacent to its namesake, the Grade II listed Great Northern Warehouse. The building was proposed in 2001 and construction began in 2004 with completion in 2007. The total cost of the development was £32,800,000 and comprises 257 apartments. It was designed by Assael Architecture and built by Carillion.

The sloped style of the building was designed to complement the curved roof of the neighbouring Manchester Central Convention Complex, and create a distinctive silhouette to the Manchester skyline. Clad in glass, metal, and grey tiles, the tower slopes in profile from 10 to 25 storeys, and has two levels in the basement.

== Amenities ==
The building is located centrally in regards to the main tram and railway stations in Manchester, with the Deansgate-Castlefield tram stop/Deansgate railway station, St Peter's Square tram stop and Manchester Oxford Road railway station each within a few minutes walk. It is also adjacent to Deansgate and the Manchester Central Convention Complex (commonly known as Manchester Central or GMEX).

== Occupancy ==
The building's ground floor units have hosted numerous businesses over the years, including the One Watson Street, Taps and Epernay champagne bars, the Zaika and Kolkata restaurants, and more recently the Kieley's Irish Bar.

== Gallery ==
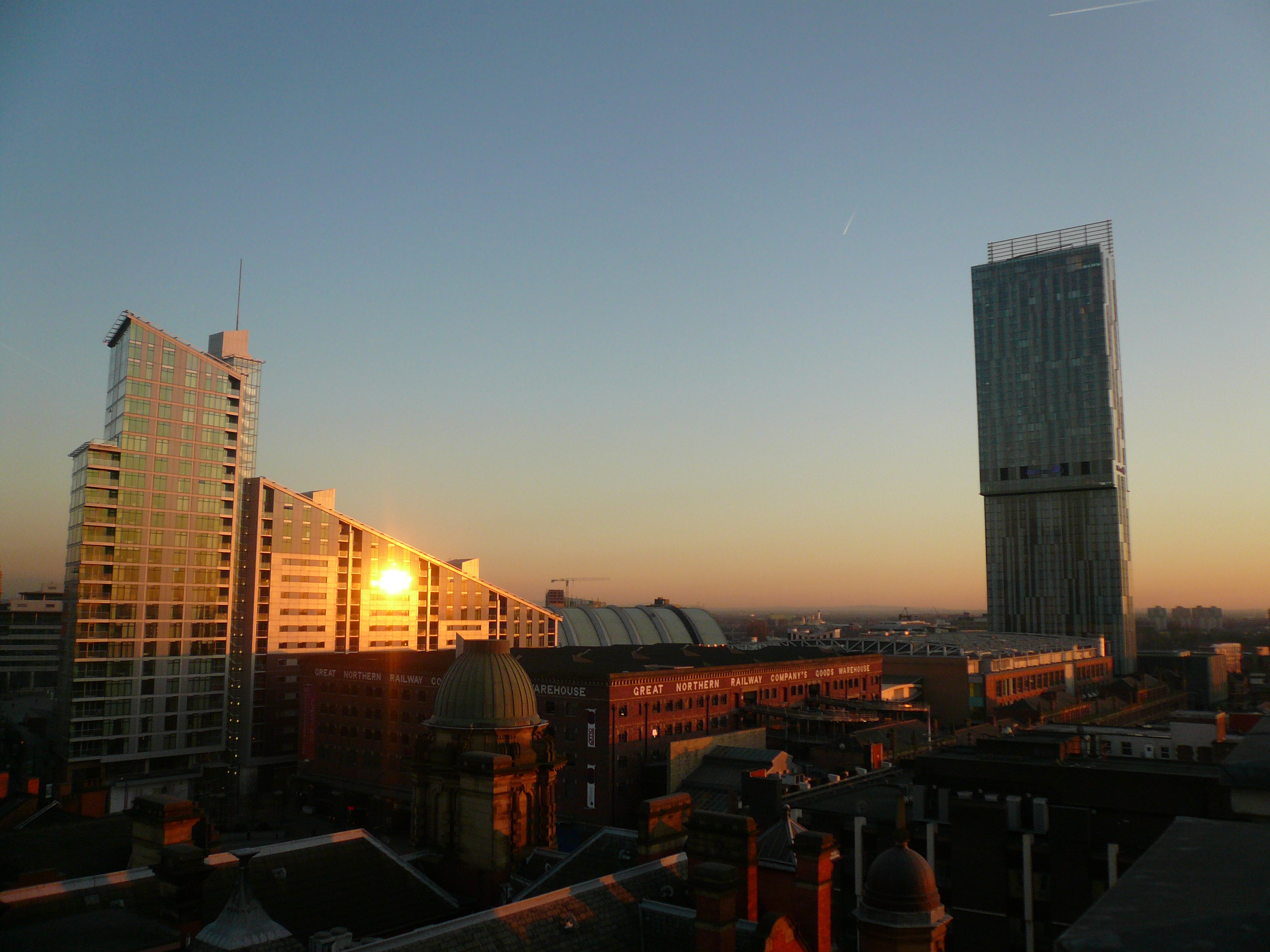
Aerial view at sunset

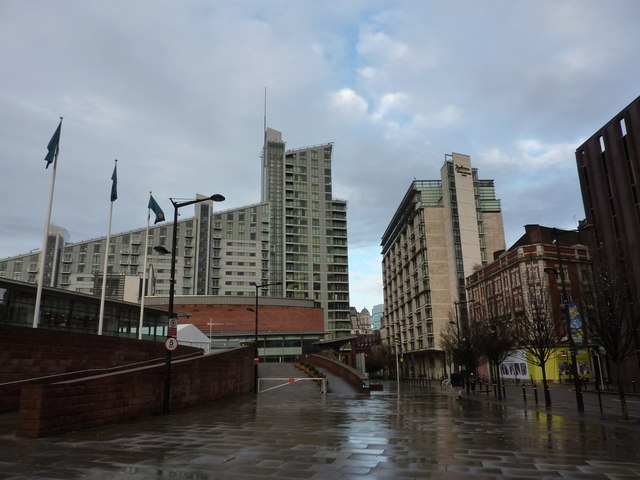
Viewed from Manchester centre

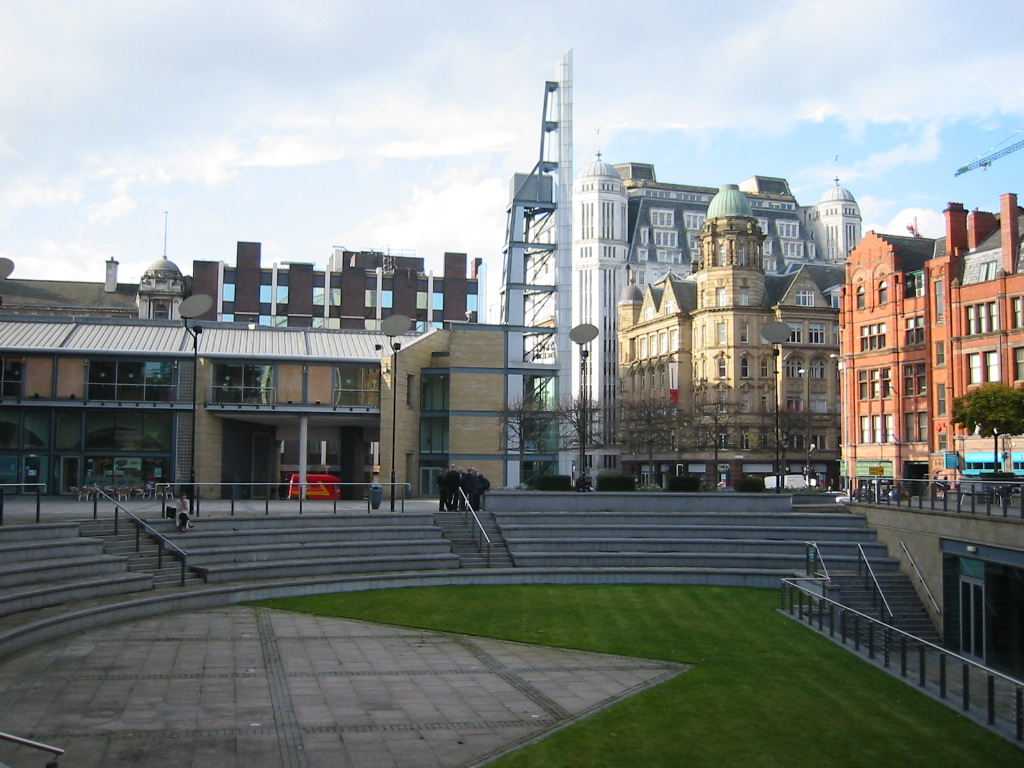
Great Northern Square

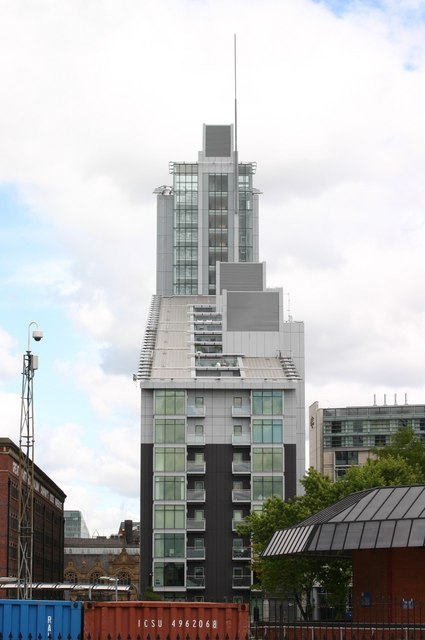
Viewed from behind

== See also ==
- List of tallest buildings and structures in Greater Manchester
