= Phoebe Sengers =

American computer scientist and ethnographer

Phoebe Sengers is an American computer scientist and ethnographer, currently a professor at Cornell University with a joint appointment in the Department of Science & Technology Studies and the Department of Information Science. She directs a research group on culturally embedded computing, and also holds affiliations with the Cornell Department of Computer Science, Cornell Institute for Digital Agriculture, and Atkinson Center for Sustainability. Her research concerns technology and society, human–computer interaction, and sustainable computing, particularly focusing on experiences in rural areas, among the working classes, and in the developing world.

== Education and career ==
Sengers studied computer science at Johns Hopkins University, graduating in 1990 with a minor in German. She completed a self-defined Ph.D. in artificial intelligence and cultural theory in 1998, at Carnegie Mellon University. Her dissertation, Anti-Boxology: Agent Design in Cultural Context, was supervised by Joseph Bates.

After postdoctoral research as a Fulbright Scholar at the ZKM Center for Art and Media Karlsruhe in Germany, and at the [[German National Research Center for Information Technology]] (now part of the FZI Forschungszentrum Informatik), she came to Cornell as an assistant professor in both the Department of Science & Technology Studies and the Department of Information Science in 2001. She also received an NSF CAREER award and led the Cornell campus of the Intel Science and Technology Center for Social Computing. She was promoted to associate professor in 2008. In 2020 she reduced her appointment to half-time, and in 2022 she was promoted to full professor, still at half-time. Sengers is engaged in a long-term ethnographic project to study sociological changes brought about by technology in the Change Islands, Newfoundland, an isolated and tradition-bound fishing community.Recognition

Sengers was elected to the CHI Academy in 2023. She was named as an ACM Fellow, in the 2023 class of fellows, for "contributions to critically-informed human-computer interaction and design".

== Personal life ==
Sengers is one of four children of Dutch-American physicists Anneke Levelt Sengers and Jan V. Sengers.
