= Jan V. Sengers =

Dutch-American physicist

- Born: May 27, 1931; Heiloo, Netherlands
- Education: University of Amsterdam
- Occupation: Physicist
- Known for: Critical phenomena; Transport Properties; Non-equilibrium statistical physics
- Spouse: J. M. H. (Anneke) Levelt Sengers
- Awards: Touloukian Award of ASME; Doctor Honoris Causa, TU Delft
- Scientific career
- Fields: Experimental and theoretical statistical physics
- Workplaces: University of Maryland; National Institute of Standards and Technology
- Doctoral advisor: A.M.J.F Michels

Jan Vincent Sengers (born May 27, 1931) is a Dutch–American physicist and a distinguished university professor emeritus at the Institute for Physical Science and Technology of University of Maryland. He is known for seminal contributions in critical and non-equilibrium phenomena in soft condensed matter.

== Education ==
Jan Sengers received his bachelor's degree in physics and mathematics in 1952, his master’s degree in physics in 1955, and his Ph.D. in physics in 1962, all cum laude from the University of Amsterdam.

== Career ==
In 1963 Jan Sengers, together with his spouse Anneke Levelt Sengers, emigrated to the United States to become a physicist at the National Bureau of Standards (NBS) that became the National Institute of Standards and Technology (NIST) in 1988. He joined the University of Maryland, College Park in 1968, first as associate professor and subsequently as professor in the Institute for Molecular Physics that was merged with the Institute for Fluid Dynamics and Applied Mathematics to become the Institute for Physical Science and Technology (IPST) in 1976. At the University of Maryland, he was also affiliate professor of chemical engineering from 1991 to 1994 and chair of the Department of chemical engineering from 1994 to 1999. Jan Sengers served as director of the Chemical Physics Program from 1978 to 1985 and as chair of the Burgers Program for Fluid Dynamics from 2003 to 2006. He was also affiliate professor of mechanical engineering from 1996 to 1999 and from 2002 to 2021. Jan Sengers became distinguished university research professor Emeritus in 1999 and served as a Research Professor in IPST from 2000 to 2021. While at the University of Maryland he also remained affiliated with NBS/NIST, first on an intermittent basis from 1968 to 2001 and subsequently as a guest researcher from 2001 to 2022.

== Research ==
At the Van der Waals Laboratory in Amsterdam, Jan Sengers performed some breakthrough experiments showing that the thermal conductivity of a fluid diverges at the critical point. After his arrival in the US, he was the first to obtain some rigorous results concerning the density corrections beyond the dilute-gas limit for the transport properties of a gas of hard spheres.

At the University of Maryland, Jan Sengers was for many years the leader of a research group studying critical phenomena both experimentally and theoretically, establishing the principle of critical universality for equilibrium and nonequilibrium critical phenomena. His group also developed a theory for the crossover form asymptotic critical behavior of thermodynamic and transport properties to classical behavior far away from the critical point. Mikhail Anisimov joined the research group at the University of Maryland in 1994 and together Sengers and Anisimov further developed the crossover theory for critical phenomena, including crossover from Ising-like critical behavior to triple-point behavior of polymer solutions. The research group of Jan Sengers also demonstrated experimentally the long-range nature of thermal fluctuations in liquids in thermal nonequilibrium states. These nonequilibrium fluctuations will produce giant nonequilibrium Casimir pressures in soft condensed matter as predicted by Ted Kirkpatrick, Jose Ortiz de Zárate, and Jan Sengers. Jan Sengers has also been active in the standardization of transport properties of water and steam for the International Association for the Properties of Water and Steam and in the development of correlations for the transport properties of fluids as part of research projects of IUPAC and of the International Association for Transport Properties.

== Awards and honors ==
- Correspondent of the Royal Netherlands Academy of Sciences (1980)
- Touloukian Award of American Society of Mechanical Engineers (1991)
- Doctor Honoris Causa, Technical University Delft (1992)
- Distinguished University Professor, University of Maryland (1997)
- Academician Emeritus of the International Academy of Refrigeration of the Russian Federation (2002)
- Fellow of American Institute of Chemical Engineers, American Society of Mechanical Engineers, American Physical Society, American Association for the Advancement of Science, International Association for the Properties of Water and Steam, International Union of Pure and Applied Chemistry, World Innovation Foundation

== Personal life ==
Jan Sengers married physicist Anneke Levelt Sengers; their four children include computer scientist and ethnographer Phoebe Sengers.
