= International Journal of Thermophysics =

- Discipline: Physics
- Language: English
- Edited by: William M. Haynes

Publication details
- History: 1980–present
- Publisher: Springer Science+Business Media
- Frequency: Bimonthly
- Impact factor: 1.608 (2020)

Standard abbreviations
- ISO 4: Int. J. Thermophys.

Indexing
- CODEN: IJTHDY
- ISSN: 0195-928X (print); 1572-9567 (web)
- LCCN: 81640144
- OCLC no.: 231029324

Links
- Journal homepage; Online access

The International Journal of Thermophysics is a bimonthly peer-reviewed scientific journal published by Springer Science+Business Media. It was established in 1980. The editor-in-chief is currently Marc J. Assael (Professor of Thermophysical Properties, Aristotle University of Thessaloniki, Greece). The 2020 impact factor was 1.608.

== Scope ==
This journal covers research on theory and experimental results pertaining to the thermophysical properties of solid states, liquids, and gases, encompassing temperature, pressure, wavelength and other variables of interest. Instruments, techniques, measurement, computer modeling, and related systems are also covered.

== Abstracting and indexing ==
The journal is abstracted and indexed in:

- Chemistry Citation Index
- Current Contents/Physical, Chemical and Earth Sciences
- Materials Science Citation Index
- Reaction Citation Index
- Science Citation Index
- Academic OneFile
- Astrophysics Data System
- Chemical Engineering and Biotechnology Abstracts
- Chemical Abstracts Service
- Chimica
- Earthquake Engineering Abstracts
- EBSCO databases
- EI/Compendex
- Engineered Materials Abstracts
- INIS Atomindex
- Inspec
- Scopus
- Summon by Serial Solutions
