= Southeast Asia in the Age of Commerce =

Two-volume work by Australian historian Anthony Reid

- Volume I (1988), The Lands Below the Winds
- Author: Anthony Reid
- Publisher: Yale University Press
- ISBN: 978-0-300-04750-9 (Vol. I); 978-0-300-05412-5 (Vol. II); Also available in cloth and eBook

Southeast Asia in the Age of Commerce 1450–1680 is a two-volume work by Australian historian Anthony Reid, published by Yale University Press. Volume I (1988), The Lands Below the Winds describes the pre-colonial region in terms of environment, physical well-being, material culture, social organisation and leisure activity. Volume II (1993), Expansion and Crisis, defines the period through the rise and fall of external trade, urbanism, the political domination of maritime gunpowder states, and the transition to scriptural religions.

== Argument ==
Reid avowedly follows the model of Fernand Braudel in asserting the coherence of a maritime region united by sea, despite differences in religion and culture, and in beginning with long-standing structures before proceeding to conjunctures, with the events (événements) seen as resulting surface phenomena. Reid argues that the humid tropical environment suitable to rice agriculture and to maritime communication explain similarities in material culture and even folk beliefs despite the lack of unifying polity such as the Roman Empire in the Mediterranean. He proposes a boom in long-distance trade on the region, stimulated by New World and Japanese silver and the competition for Indonesian spices, followed in the 17th century by Southeast Asia's relatively acute version of the global mid-seventeenth century crisis, part climatic, part financial, and part the effect of Dutch spice monopolies.

== Reception ==
The first volume was well received by most reviewers, including Clifford Geertz, Norman Owen, and Eric Jones. The argument of the second volume that the expansive phase ended in a seventeenth century crisis was more controversial, some feeling it downgraded the dynamism of the eighteenth century. Victor Lieberman, while generally favourable, argued that this expansion and crisis pattern worked only for Island Southeast Asia, while the Mainland states had their political crisis in the eighteenth century, if at all. Economic historians welcomed Volume II for allowing Southeast Asia to enter the Great Divergence debate, while Social historians found Volume I more innovative.

The two volumes were appreciated in Asia, where Indonesian (1992–99) Japanese (1997-2001), Thai (2004) and Chinese (2010–11) translations appeared. The Fukuoka Asian Culture Prize was awarded to Reid largely on the strength of this book, which used "an enormous number of historical records to create a new type of historical research. His arguments are formulated from the perspective of the everyday life of the people, and include both the shared and unique characteristics of the nations of Southeast Asia created by large-scale maritime trade from 1450 to 1680, as well as the diversity of the natural environment and religion".
