= Anthony Reid (academic) =

Australian academic (1939–2025)

Anthony Reid FBA FRHistS
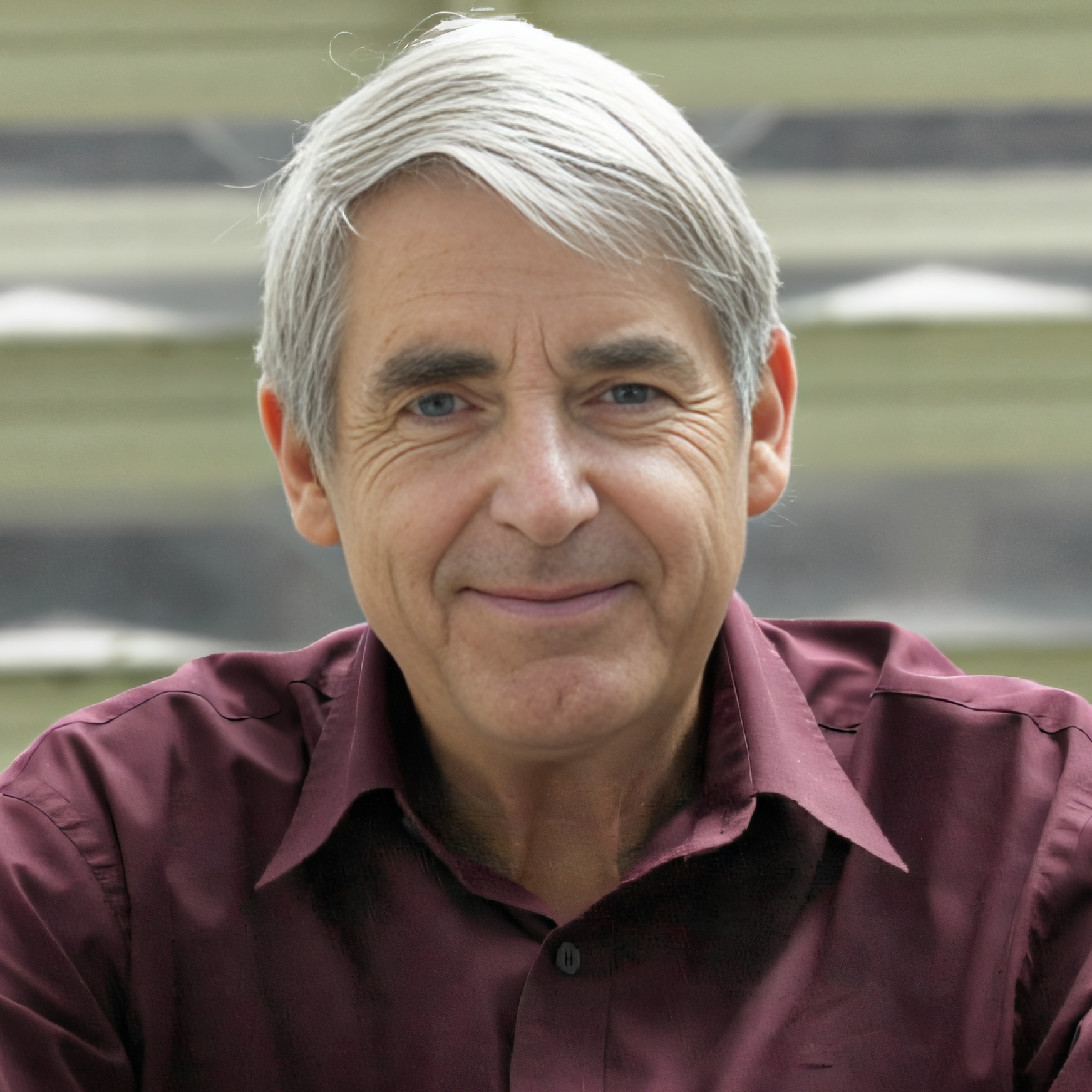
- Reid in 2023
- Born: Anthony John Stanhope Reid; 19 June 1939; Wellington, New Zealand
- Died: 8 June 2025 (aged 85); Canberra, ACT, Australia
- Known for: Work on the history of Southeast Asia
- Spouse: Helen Margaret Reid (née Gray)
- Children: 2
- Relatives: John Reid (father)

Academic background
- Education: Victoria University of Wellington; University of Cambridge

Academic work
- Discipline: History
- Institutions: University of Malaya; Australian National University; UCLA; National University of Singapore

Anthony John Stanhope Reid FBA FRHistS (19 June 1939 – 8 June 2025) was a New Zealand-born historian of Southeast Asia. He is most well known for his two volume book, Southeast Asia in the Age of Commerce, developed during his time at the Research School of Pacific (and Asian) Studies, Australian National University, in Canberra. His later work includes a return to Sumatra where he explored the historical basis for the separate identity of Aceh; interests in nationalism, Chinese diaspora and economic history, and latterly the relation between geology and deep history.

== Academic career ==
Reid was the son of John Stanhope Reid, a New Zealand diplomat who held postings in Indonesia, Japan and Canada in the 1950s and 1960s. He earned his Bachelor of Arts in Economics and History, and his Master of Arts in History from Victoria University of Wellington. Reid's doctoral work at the University of Cambridge examined the contest for power in northern Sumatra, Indonesia, in the late 19th century, and he extended this study into a book The Blood of the People on the national and social revolutions in that region between 1945 and 1949.

Reid taught Southeast Asian history at the University of Malaya between 1965 and 1970, and the Australian National University from 1970 to 1999. Between 1999 and 2002, he was the founding director of the Southeast Asia Center, University of California, Los Angeles, and then the founding director of the Asia Research Institute (ARI) at the National University of Singapore (NUS) from 2002 to 2007. He retired from NUS in 2009. Thereafter, he was based in Canberra as a professor emeritus at the Australian National University.

== Fiction ==
As a writer of fiction, Reid styled himself Tony Reid.

== Death ==
Reid died at a hospital in Canberra, on 8 June 2025, at the age of 85.

== Honours and awards ==
Reid was elected a Fellow of the Australian Academy of the Humanities in 1987. He won the Fukuoka Asian Culture Prize in the category of academics in 2002. He was elected as a Corresponding Fellow at the prestigious British Academy on 17 July 2008.

== List of major publications ==
- The Contest for North Sumatra: Atjeh, the Netherlands and Britain, 1858–1898. Kuala Lumpur, OUP/UMP, 1969. Reissued by University of Malaya Press, 1974; New edition University of Malaya Press, 2017.
  Indonesian translation as Asal Mula Konflik Aceh, Jakarta, Yayasan Obor, 2007.
- The Indonesian National Revolution, 1945–1950. Hawthorn, Vic. Longmans Australia, 1974. Reprinted by Greenwood Press, Westport, Conn., 1986.
  Indonesian translation as Revolusi Nasional Indonesia. Jakarta, Sinar Harapan, 1996.
- The Blood of the People: Revolution and the End of Traditional Rule in Northern Sumatra. Kuala Lumpur, OUP, 1979.
  Indonesian translation as Perjuangan Rakyat: Revolusi dan Hancurnya Kerajaan di Sumatra. Jakarta, Sinar Harapan, 1986.
- Southeast Asia in the Age of Commerce, 1450–1680. Vol.I: The Lands below the Winds. New Haven, Yale University Press, 1988.

- Indonesian translation as Asia Tenggara dalam Kurun Niaga (Jakarta, Yayasan Obor, 1992).
- Southeast Asia edition Trasvin Publications [Silkworm Books], Chiang Mai, 1995, reprinted 1999.
- Japanese translation Hosei University Press, 1997.
- Thai translation Silkworm Books, Chiang Mai, 2004
- Chinese translation by The Commercial Press, 2010.

- Southeast Asia in the Age of Commerce, 1450–1680. Vol.II: Expansion and Crisis. New Haven, Yale University Press (1993).

- Indonesian translation as Dari Ekspansi hingga Krisis: Jaringan Perdagangan Global Asia Tenggara, 1450–1680, (1999).
- Japanese translation as Daikokai Jidai no Tonan Ajia II (Tokyo, Hosei University Press,, 2001).
- Thai translation 2004; Chinese translation 2010

- Charting the Shape of Early Modern Southeast Asia. Chiang Mai: Silkworm Books, 1999, 298pp.
  Indonesian translation (2004).
- An Indonesian Frontier: Acehnese and other histories of Sumatra. Singapore: Singapore University Press, 2004; 439pp.- reprinted 2005. Indonesian translation 2011.
- Imperial Alchemy: Nationalism and Political Identity in Southeast Asia. Cambridge: Cambridge University Press, 2009.
- To Nation by Revolution: Indonesia in the Twentieth Century. Singapore: NUS Press, 2011. Indonesian translation, 2018.
- A History of Southeast Asia: Critical Crossroads. Chichester, UK: Wiley/Blackwell, 2015. Chinese and Japanese translations, 2021.
- as editor, Slavery, Bondage and Dependency in Southeast Asia. St Lucia: Queensland University Press and New York, St Martin's Press, 1983.
- as editor, Sojourners and Settlers: Histories of Southeast Asia and the Chinese, Honolulu: University of Hawai’i Press, 2001.
- as editor with Daniel Chirot, Essential Outsiders: Chinese and Jews in the Modern Transformation of Southeast Asia and Central Europe, Seattle, University of Washington Press, 1997.

Reid wrote a novel, Mataram, about 17th-century Java, depicting the experiences of Tom Hodges, a fictional English East India Company officer, who sets off from Banten in 1608 with his Javanese paramour to reach the mysterious inland kingdom of Mataram.
