= Victoria Square, Montreal =

Square in Montreal, Quebec, Canada

Victoria Square
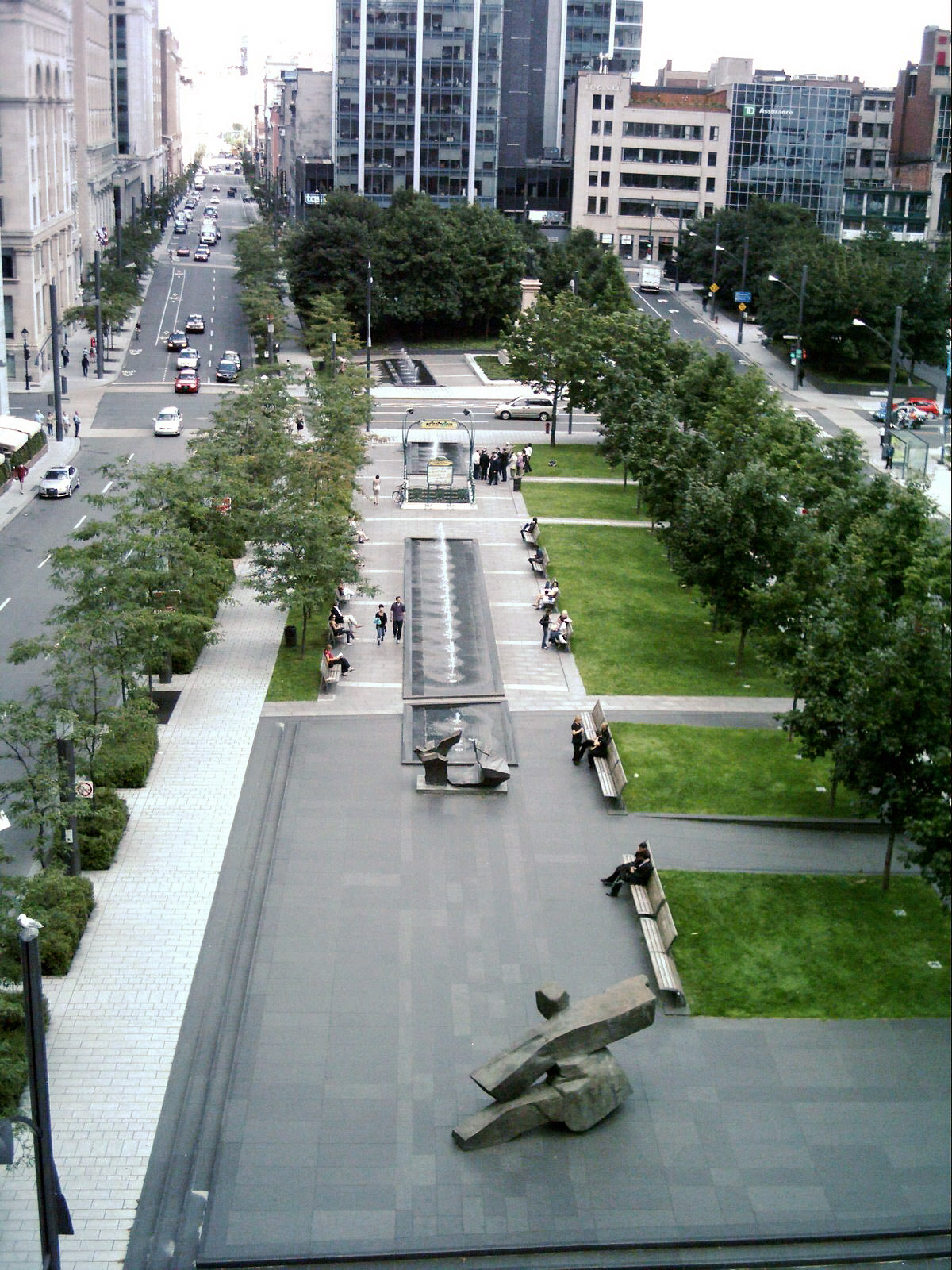
- View towards the south-east with the Tai Chi Single Whip sculpture in foreground and Metro entrance towards the center.

- Location within Montreal
- Type: Town square
- Location: Old Montreal, Ville-Marie Montreal, Quebec, Canada
- Coordinates: 45°30′04″N 73°33′43″W
- Created: 1860
- Operator: City of Montreal
- Status: Open all year
- Public transit: Square-Victoria-OACI

Victoria Square (officially in French: Square Victoria) is a town square and public space in the Quartier International de Montréal (also called the International Quarter) area of downtown Montreal, Quebec, Canada, at the intersection of Beaver Hall Hill and McGill Street. The Square forms an integral component of the city's urban public transit system and constitutes a 'prestige address' for the international face of the city. It is bordered by Viger Street to the north, Saint Jacques Street to the south, Beaver Hall Hill to the west and Square Victoria Street (an extension of McGill Street) along the eastern side. As with other city squares, Square Victoria is open 24 hours per day to all citizens of Montreal and provides the role of an urban breathing space, with dense foliage to the south that tapers as the square rises up Beaver Hall Hill.

== History ==
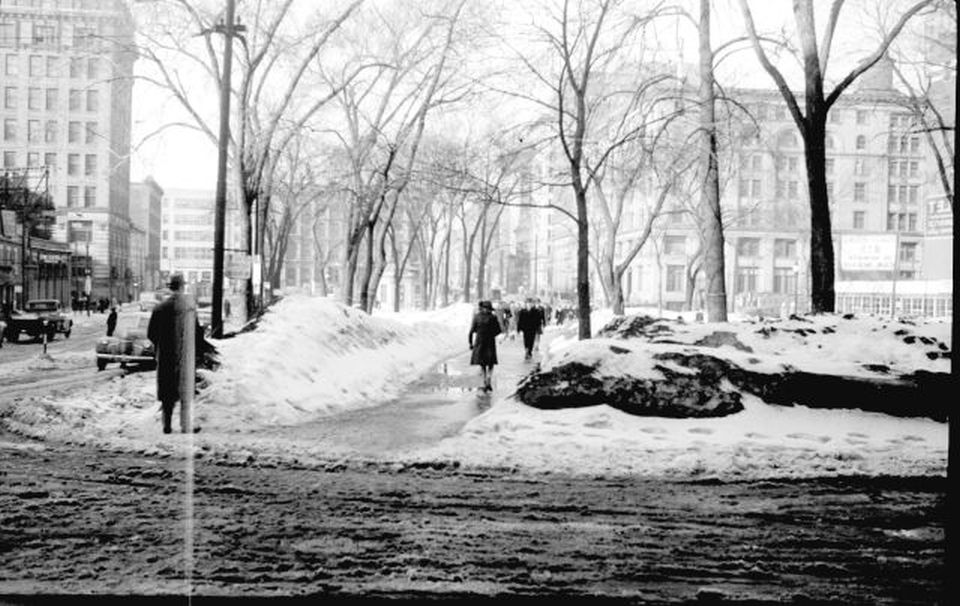
Victoria Square, 1943

The square has existed since 1813. Formerly known as Place du Marché-à-Foin and Place des Commissaires, it was renamed for Queen Victoria for the visit of the then-Prince of Wales (later King Edward VII) in 1860.

Victoria Square has undergone many aesthetic changes over its history, functioning at times more as a parking lot, other times as a simple open space, while at others being far more refined and cultivated. The Square was restored to its current configuration in 2002 and 2003. It features Hector Guimard's Art Nouveau outdoor entrance to the Square-Victoria–OACI Metro station, a statue of Queen Victoria, the Tai Chi Single Whip sculpture by Ju Ming, and trees lining its bounding avenues.

== Location ==
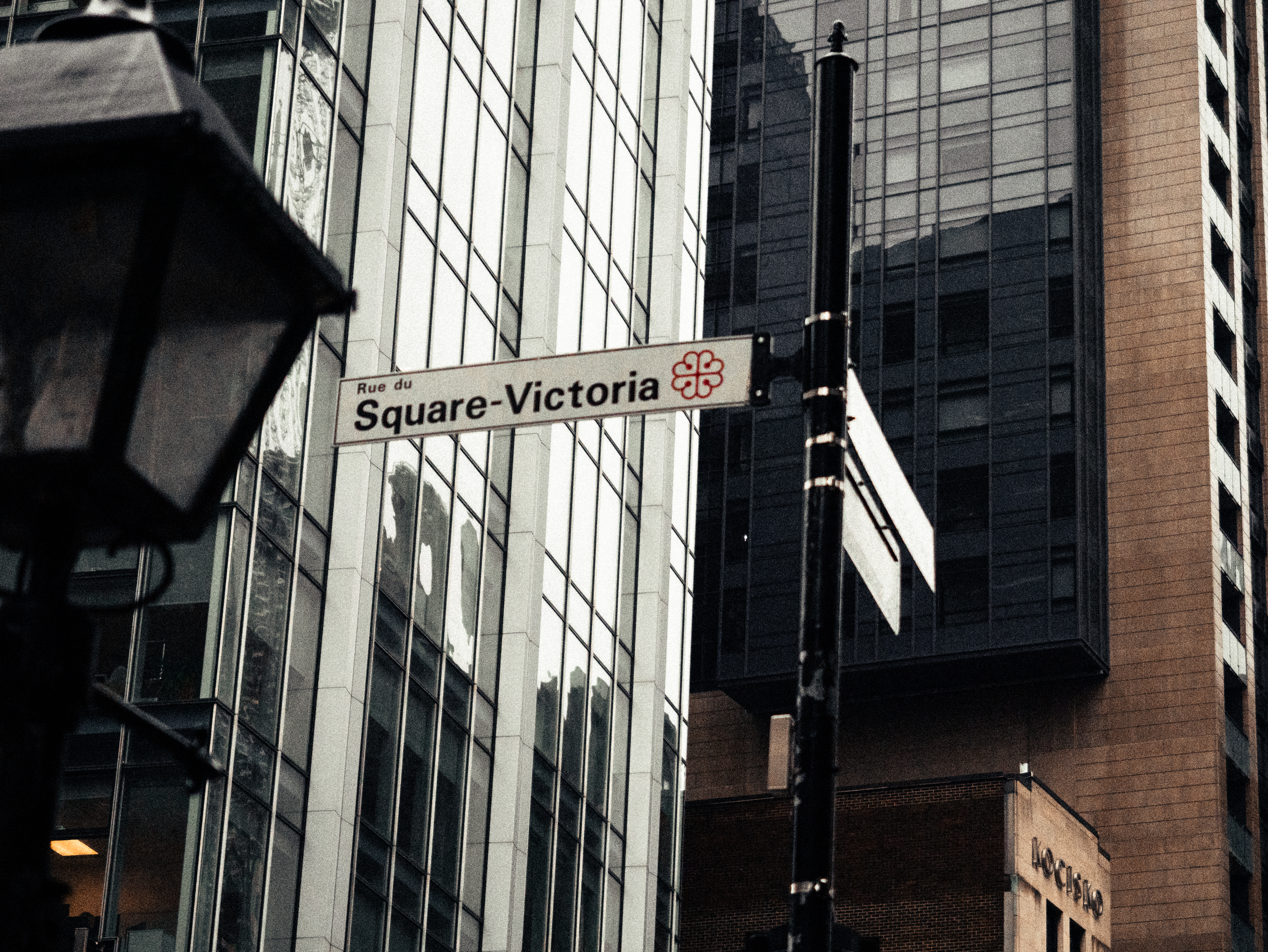
Rue du Square-Victoria Street Sign in Montreal

The square is now fronted on the east by the CDP Capital Centre, the World Trade Centre Montreal and the Hotel W Montréal, to the west by Tour de la Bourse and Place de la Cité internationale, to the north by the Altoria/Aimia Tower, and to the south by the Quebecor building, its outdated façade fully redesigned.

== See also ==
- Architecture of Montreal
- Monarchy in Quebec
- Royal monuments in Canada
- Royal eponyms in Canada
