= Namjilyn Norovbanzad =

Mongolian singer (1931–2002)

Namjilyn Norovbanzad (Mongolian: Намжилын Норовбанзад; 10 December 1931 – 2002) was a Mongolian singer of the traditional long song.

Born in Ulaan Oovo in the southern Dundgovi province of Mongolia, Norovbanzad grew up in a family of herders. Her father was Damdin and her other was Namjil. She started her working career as a typist at the provincial court in 1952. After winning several local and provincial singing competitions she moved to the capital city Ulaanbaatar to pursue her singing career full-time.

Norovbanzad was awarded Ardiyn jujigchin ('People’s Artist') merit by the Government of Mongolia in 1969 and was voted the Singer of the Century by the people in 2000. In 1957, she won a gold medal of the World Festival of Youth and Students held in Moscow with 35,000 participants, and the Fukuoka Asian Culture Prize in the category "Arts and Culture" in 1993.

== Phonography ==
- Urtiin Duu, Rough Trade Records 1996
