= Yujiro Hayami =

Japanese agricultural economist

- Born: 26 November 1932; Japan
- Died: 24 December 2012 (aged 80)
- Occupation(s): Agriculturist, Economist, author
- Awards: Fukuoka Academic Prize; Rockefeller Fellowship; Purple Ribbon; Honorary Lifetime Member of the International Association of Agricultural Economists

Yujiro Hayami (速水 佑次郎, Hayami Yūjirō; 1932–2012) was a Japanese agricultural economist, widely considered to be an authority on the subject. He was a Rockefeller fellow at Iowa University, a winner of Purple Ribbon Medal and a Lifetime member of the International Association of Agricultural Economists. He is credited with the development Hayami Development Economics, an agricultural philosophy on the relationship of a community to the market and the state. He died on 24 December 2012.

== Biography ==
Hayami was born on 26 November 1932 in Tokyo, Japan. His college education was at the Faculty of Liberal Arts, University of Tokyo, from where he graduated in 1956. He continued his education as a research associate at the National Research Institute of Agricultural Economics, Ministry of Agriculture, Forestry and Fisheries, Ngoyo, Japan, but a year later, moved to the Department of Economics and Sociology, University of Iowa from where he obtained his PhD in 1960.

== Career ==
Hayami started his career in 1966, as an associate professor, Faculty of Economics at Tokyo Metropolitan University where he worked till 1986. In between, he was also a visiting associate professor of agricultural economics at the University of Minnesota from 1968 to 1970 and Agricultural Economist at the International Rice Research Institute in the Philippines from 1974 to 1976. In 1986, he joined the School of International Politics, Economics and Business, Aoyama Gakuin University, Tokyo, where he worked as the professor of economics till 2000 when he was made the director of the Foundation for Advanced Studies on International Development (FASID) till his death on 24 December 2012. Professor Hayami was also a visiting T. H. Lee Professor of World Affairs Chair, Cornell University from 1995 to 1996.

The major achievements credited to Yujiro Hayami are:

- A research conducted at the International Rice Research Institute (IRRI) in the Philippines, that led to the Green Revolution on high yielding varieties of rice.
- Development of a new stream of academics called Hayami Development Economics which focusses on the relationship between the community, market and the state.

He is also credited with redefining the discipline of agricultural economics with special emphasis on economic development of the developing countries, focusing on the issues related to income distribution and the environmental problems faced by the developed countries.

== Awards and recognitions ==
- Fukuoka Academic Prize – 2001
- Purple Ribbon Medal – 1999
- Honorary Lifetime Member from the International Association of Agricultural Economists – 1997
- Nikkei Prize for excellent books in Economic Science – 1996
- Honorary Fellow, American Agricultural Economics Association – 1991
- NIRA Tohata Memorial award for policy studies, the National Institute for Research Advancement- 1987
- Nikkei Prize for excellent books in Economic Science – 1973
- Rockefeller Fellow at the University of Iowa

== Books and publications ==
- Hayami, Yujiro; Aoki, Masahiko (2001). Communities and Markets in Economic Development. Oxford University Press. doi:10.1093/0199241015.001.0001. ISBN 9780199241019.
- Hayami, Yujiro and Vernon W. Ruttan (1985). Agricultural development: an international perspective. Johns Hopkins University Press. ISBN 9780801823763.
- Hanpongpandh, Somporn; Ochoa García, Libardo; Alarcón González, Diana; Damiani, Octavio; Portocarrero Maisch, Felipe; Berry, Albert; Martowijoyo, Sumantoro; Rey de Marulanda, Nohra; Chowdhury, Abdul-Muyeed; Liu, Chien-Zer; Van Hung, Dao; Lee, Dong-Phil; Búcaro, Edgar R.; Echeverría, Ruben G.; Sadoulet, Elisabeth; Leonardo, Nuria Costa; Rahman Khan, Azizur; Hayami, Yujiro; Bucher, Dieter; Maung, Mya; de Janvry, Alain (2006). Priorities and Strategies in Rural Poverty Reduction: Experiences from Latin America and Asia. IDB Publications. ISBN 978-1931003889.
- Hayami, Yujiro; Masao Kikuchi (1999). A Rice Village Saga: Three Decades of Green Revolution in the Philippines. Rowman & Littlefield Publishers. ISBN 978-0389210238.
- Hayami, Yujiro (1978). Anatomy of a Peasant Economy - A rice village in the Philippines. International Rice Research Institute. ASIN B0007AO9ZA.
- Hayami, Yujiro (2005). Development Economics: From the Poverty to the Wealth of Nations. Oxford University Press. ISBN 9780195676280.

He has also written many articles and working papers, counting more than 70, which are in circulation worldwide.
