= Tai Chi Single Whip =

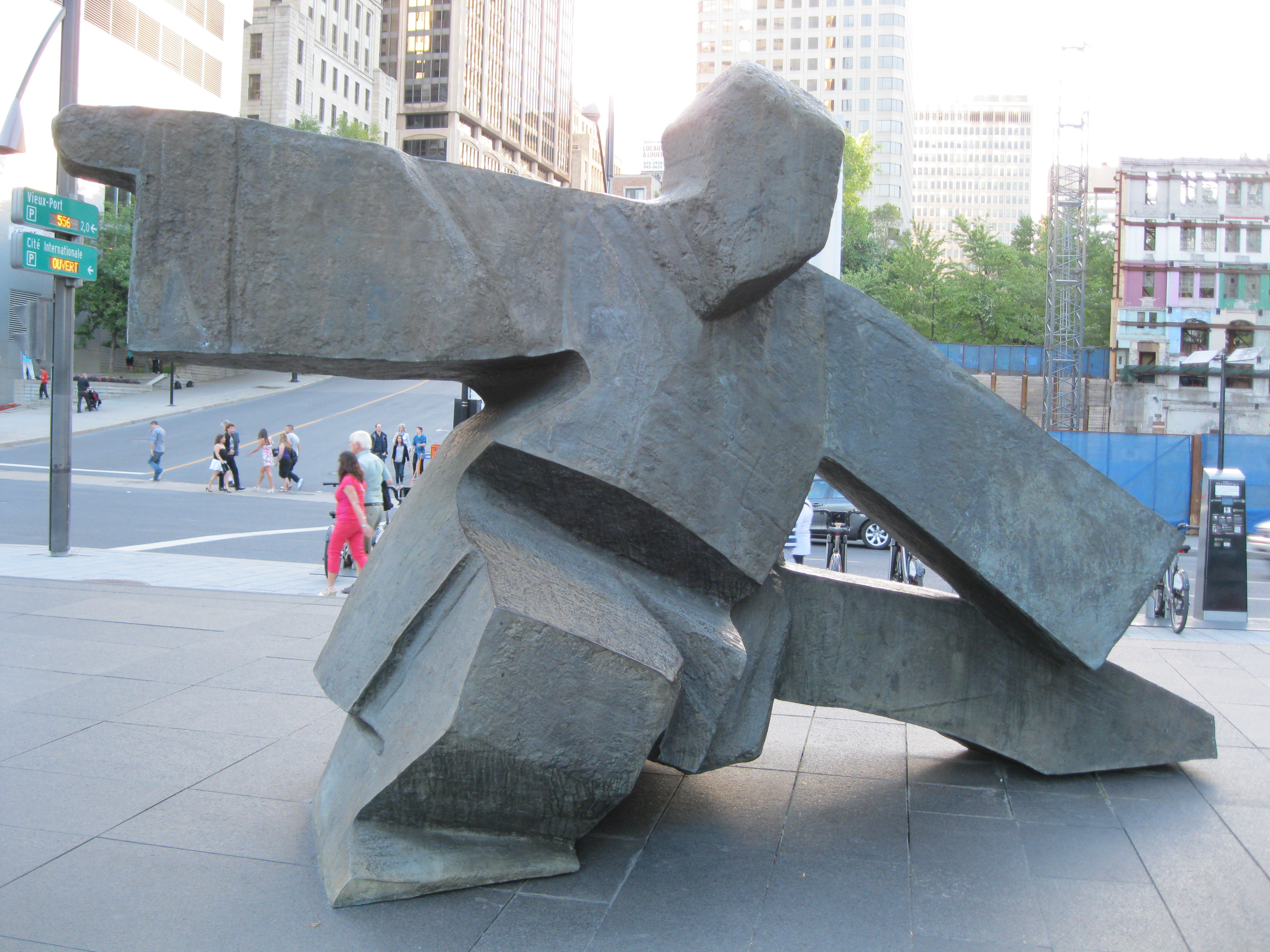
- The sculpture in 2012
- Artist: Ju Ming
- Medium: Sculpture
- Location: Montreal, Quebec, Canada
- 45.502030°N 73.562820°W

Tai Chi Single Whip (or Taichi Single Whip) is an outdoor sculpture by Taiwanese artist Ju Ming, installed in Montreal's Victoria Square, in Quebec, Canada.
