= Suhail Zaheer Lari =

Pakistani historian and author (1936–2020)

- Born: 13 November 1936; Gorakhpur, British India
- Died: 5 December 2020 (aged 84); Karachi, Sindh, Pakistan
- Occupations: Historian and author
- Known for: Preservation of cultural heritage
- Spouse: Yasmeen Lari

Suhail Zaheer Lari (13 November 1936 – 5 December 2020; Urdu: سہیل ظہیر لاری) was a Pakistani historian and author who focused on research and documentation of the history of the Sindh region in Southern Pakistan.

He was a co-founder of the Heritage Foundation of Pakistan, a conservation organization which sought to draw awareness to the region's art, architecture, and cultural heritage.

== Early life ==
Lari was born in Gorakhpur, in modern-day Uttar Pradesh state in India, on 13 November 1936, in what was then undivided British India and was raised in Allahabad. His mother, Qabila Khatoon, was a homemaker while his father, Zaheer ul Hasnain Lari was a judge and lawyer. The family was known to be close to India's first prime minister, Jawaharlal Nehru. The family did not leave for Pakistan during the Partition of India in 1947, but, remained in Allahabad until 1950, when they moved to Lahore and later to Karachi.

Lari studied politics, philosophy and economics at St Catherine's College, Oxford, where he gained admission after writing to British philosopher Isaiah Berlin.

== Career ==
Returning from England after his studies, Lari spent two decades in the corporate world, becoming the managing director of Khyber Insurance Company. He gave up his role when the company was nationalized by the government. Post his retirement from the corporate world, he immersed himself in research and documentation of the history of the Sindh region of Southern Pakistan.

Along with his wife, Yasmeen Lari, he founded the Heritage Foundation Pakistan in 1980, as a conservation organization to generate awareness about Pakistan's art, architecture, and cultural heritage. Specifically, they focused on the preservation of over 600 historical buildings, many of which were in advanced stages of decay. In one of his noted actions, he drew attention to the Makli Necropolis, through multiple proposals for its conservation leading to the cemetery becoming a UNESCO World Heritage Site.

As an author and a photographer, he generated interest and attention to the history of the Sindh region in Southern Pakistan. He wrote more than 60 books on history, heritage and culture including An Illustrated History of Sindh, Neither Islamic nor Persian, Makli under the Samma, Makli under the Sufi, Makli under Timurid, and Meri Society Ke Log. His book Meri Mitti Ke Log, chronicled the rise of Zulfikar Ali Bhutto, Pakistan's fourth President, while Meri Society Ke Log was a societal snapshot of guests at his home. He also wrote his own memoirs online documenting his life.

He was an advocate of rainwater harvesting as a means to conserve groundwater and means to avoid flooding. He also advocated the need for low-cost housing to train manpower to build earthquake and flood resistant housing.

== Personal life ==
Lari met his future wife Yasmeen Ahsan (later Yasmeen Lari) when he was in Lahore and she went on to study architecture in London. With their parents objecting to their marriage, he would write in his memoir that they threatened to get married in Scotland where the legal age for marriage was lower than that in England; their parents subsequently agreed to the union. His wife, Yasmeen went on to become a prominent architect in Pakistan. The couple had two sons and a daughter. Their house would be the site for artists, politicians, and writers to meet.

Lari died on 5 December 2020 from COVID-19 related complications. He was aged 84.

== Publications ==
- Lari, Suhail Zaheer (1994). A History of Sindh. Oxford University Press. ISBN 978-0-19-577501-3.
- Lari, Suhail Zaheer; Lari, Yasmeen (1997). The Jewel of Sindh: Samma Monuments on Makli Hill : with 326 Illustrations, 50 in Colour. Heritage Foundation. ISBN 978-0-19-577901-1.
- Lari, Suhail Zaheer (2002). An Illustrated History of Sindh. Heritage Foundation, Pakistan.
- Lari, Suhail Zaheer (2002). Neither Islamic Nor Persian: A History of Muslim Painting. Heritage Foundation Pakistan. ISBN 978-0-00-969865-1.
- Lari, Suhail Zaheer (2012). Meri Mitti Kay Log. Heritage Foundation of Pakistan. ISBN 978-969-8655-17-4.
- Lari, Suhail Zaheer (2017). Makli Under the Sammas. Heritage Foundation of Pakistan. ISBN 978-969-8655-29-7.
- Lari, Suhail Zaheer (2018). Makli During Mughal Rule. Heritage Foundation of Pakistan. ISBN 978-969-8655-34-1.
