= Yoneo Ishii =

Japanese historian

- Born: October 10, 1929; Tokyo, Japan
- Died: February 12, 2010 (aged 80)
- Awards: Fukuoka Asian Culture Prize
- Scientific career
- Institutions: Japanese Society of Ethnology; Osaka City University; Kanda University

Yoneo Ishii (石井 米雄, Ishii Yoneo; October 10, 1929 - February 12, 2010) was a Japanese historian who specialized in the study of Thailand.

== Biography ==
Ishii was born in Tokyo, Japan. Following his teacher's recommendation to learn Thai, he went to Thailand. There, he enrolled in the Chulalongkorn University and joined the Ministry of Foreign Affairs shortly after. In 1958, due to his knowledge in history and religion of the region, he spent three months as a Buddhist priest at the Wat Bowonniwet temple in Bangkok. Later on, as a professor he joined Japanese Society of Ethnology and Osaka City University. From there, he traveled to such countries as Cambodia, Laos, Thailand and Vietnam in each one of which he studied cultures of those nations.

He completed his studies there as well, and got hired at the Japanese embassy in Bangkok where he worked for seven years. In 1963 he returned to his native land to continue his work at the Ministry of Foreign Affairs and two years later got hired by the Center for Southeast Asian Studies where he pursued his academic career. By 1967 he became a professor there and later on became a director of it in 1985 and retired five years later. During that time, he wrote and published a five-volume book called The Computer Concordance to the Law of the Three Seals, and was relocated to the Institute of Asian Cultures which was a part of Sophia University where he taught till 1993. Next year he was awarded Fukuoka Prize and is currently works at the 13th Congress of the International Association of Historians of Asia. In 1995 he became a President at the Kanda University and received Medal of Honor with the Purple ribbon, and five years later became a fellow at the Sophia University.
