= Yasmeen Lari =

Pakistani architect

- یاسمین لاری
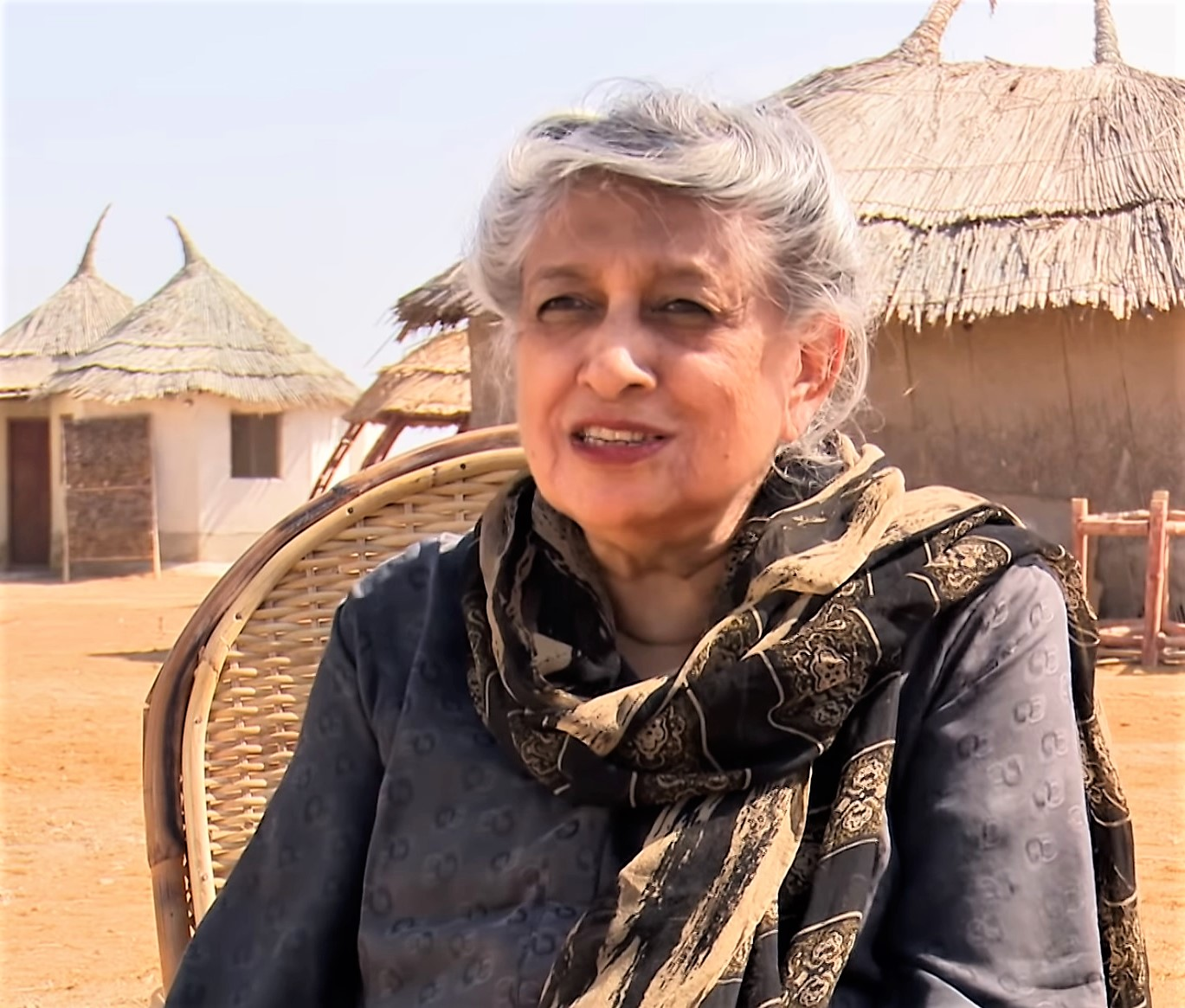
- Lari speaks to BBC News (2020) in front of some of her houses.
- Born: c.1941 (age 84–85); Dera Ghazi Khan, Punjab Province, British India
- Education: School of Architecture, Oxford Brookes University
- Organization: Lari Associates
- Spouse: Suhail Zaheer Lari
- Children: 3
- Father: Zafarul Ahsan
- Relatives: Nasreen Jalil (sister)

Yasmeen Lari (Urdu: یاسمین لاری; born c. 1941) is Pakistan's first female architect. She is best known for her involvement in the intersection of architecture and social justice. Since her official retirement from architectural practice in 2000, her UN-recognized NGO Heritage Foundation Pakistan has been taking on humanitarian relief work and historical conservation projects in rural villages all around Pakistan. She was awarded the prestigious Fukuoka Prize in 2016 and the RIBA's Royal Gold Medal in 2023.

== Early life ==
Yasmeen Lari was born in 1941 in the town of Dera Ghazi Khan, and spent her early years in and around Lahore. Her father Zafarul Ahsan, an Indian Civil Service officer, was working on major development projects in Lahore and other cities, through which Lari was exposed to architecture. Her sister is Pakistani politician Nasreen Jalil. When she was 15 years old, she first left Pakistan to go to London with her family. Initially there for a vacation, she and her siblings ended up enrolling in school in London. Upon her rejection from architecture school, Yasmeen Lari studied two years of arts in London before being accepted into the School of Architecture, Oxford Brookes University (previously named Oxford Polytechnic).

== Career ==
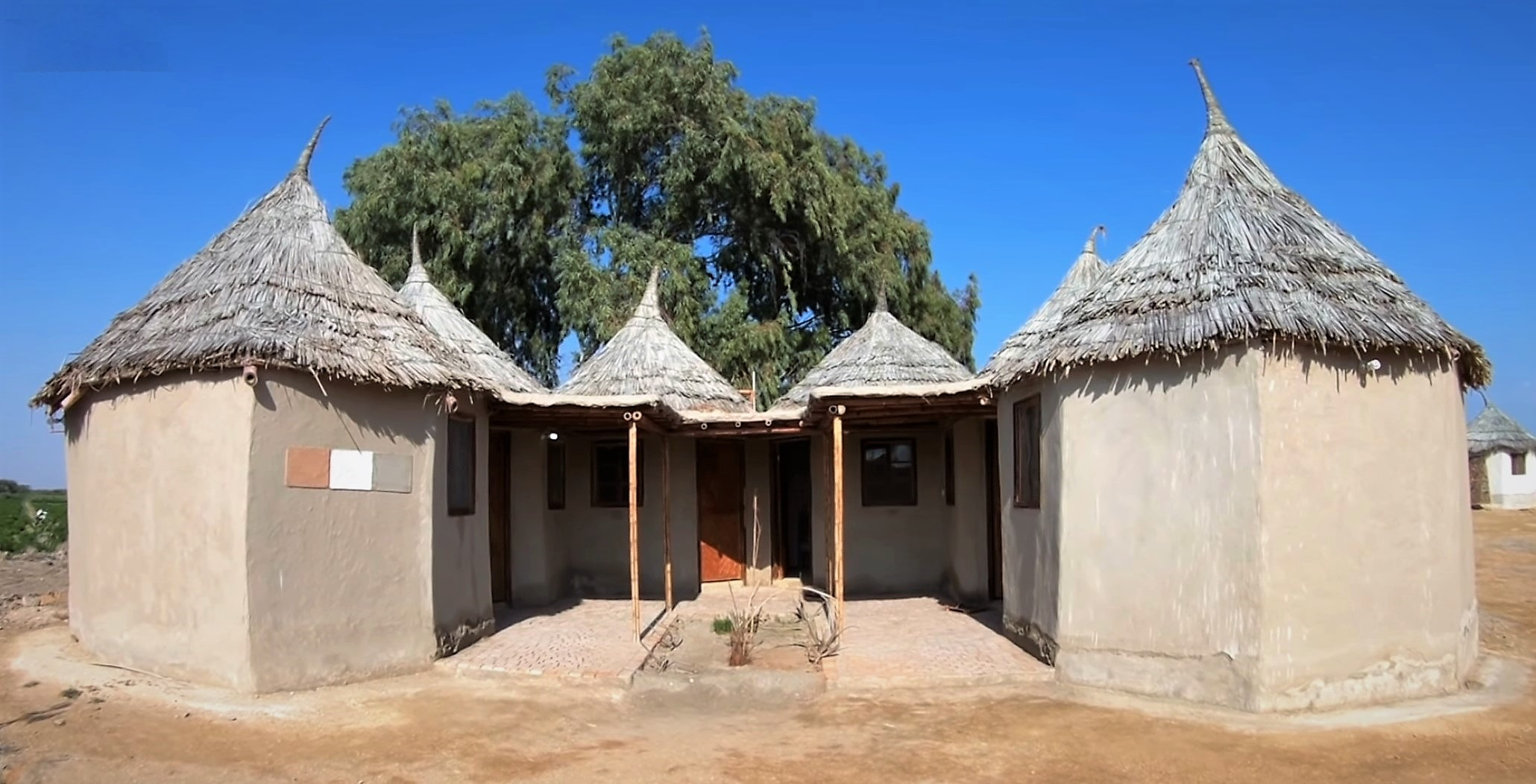
Village houses built by Lari's Heritage Foundation of Pakistan (2020).

=== Architecture (1964–2000) ===
After graduating from the Oxford School of Architecture in 1964, Lari returned to Pakistan at age 23 with her husband, Suhail Zaheer Lari, and opened her architecture firm Lari Associates in Karachi, Sindh, Pakistan. She became the first female architect in Pakistan. Initially, she faced difficulties when workers at construction sites challenged her authority or knowledge because of her gender.

In 1969, Lari became an elected Member of the Royal Institute of British Architects (RIBA).

Her later projects included housing such as the Angoori Bagh Housing (ABH) (1978), and commercial buildings such as the Taj Mahal Hotel, Karachi in 1981, the Finance and Trade Center in 1989, and the Pakistan State Oil House (PSO Company headquarters) in Karachi in 1991.

Lari retired in 2000 from architectural practice. However, she remains active with her historical preservation by serving as the advisor of the UNESCO project, as the executive director of Heritage Foundation Pakistan, and as the chairperson of the Karavan Initiatives.

=== Humanitarian efforts ===
Lari and her husband founded the Heritage Foundation of Pakistan, a humanitarian group in 1980. Since 2010, she has built some 50,000 Pakistani homes for humanitarian causes, such as for the victims of earthquakes and flooding. Lari implements traditional building techniques and local materials, such as in the 2013 rebuilding after floods in the Sindh Valley region of Pakistan and, again in that area in 2023, building low-cost, sustainable, bamboo and mud-plastered, one room homes or chauhras. In 2013, she helped villagers in Awaran District who were hit by the 2013 Balochistan earthquake.

In 2018, Lari designed a fuel-efficient and affordable chulah (stove) that improved on traditional stoves and did not emit toxic smoke into Pakistani homes. Her stove design won her a World Habitat award that same year.

Yasmeen Lari is one of the founders and current chairwoman of the Pakistani Chapter of the International Network for Traditional Building, Architecture & Urbanism (INTBAU), created in 2018.

== Design philosophy ==
On architectural practice in Southeast Asia, Lari has said, "The two ends of the spectrum of the two worlds we live and work in are best captured in the words of two famous architects, Mies van der Rohe and Hassan Fathy. Mies van der Rohe, a master of putting the elements of a building together and the grand master of detail, has said: "I am first interested in a good building. Then I place it in the best possible spot.' In contrast Hassan Fathy, who has spoken more forcefully than any other on the beatify of the vernacular and the importance of tradition, states: 'You must start from the beginning, letting your new buildings grow from the daily lives of the people who will live in them, shaping the houses to the measure of people's songs, weaving the pattern of a village as if on the village looms, mindful of the trees and the crafts that grow there, respectful of the skylines and humble before the seasons.'"

She is best known for her work in the intersection of architecture and social justice.

== Architectural work ==
=== Completed projects ===
Completed projects by Lari
Date	Name	Location	Notes
1978	Angoori Bagh Housing (also known as ABH, or Anguri Bagh)	Lahore, Pakistan	Pakistan's first public housing plan.
1981	Taj Mahal Hotel, Karachi	Karachi, Pakistan	
1989	Finance and Trade Center (FTC Building)	Karachi, Pakistan	
1991	Pakistan State Oil House (PSO House)	Karachi, Pakistan	
2011	Women's Centre	Darya Khan, Pakistan	

=== Historical conservation and restoration projects (incomplete) ===
- Khairpur Heritage Centre
- Sethi house in Sethi Mohallah (2010–2012)

== Bibliography ==
Some of Yasmeen Lari's publications include:

- Slums and Squatter Settlements: Their Role and Improvement Strategy
- Our Heritage in Muslim Architecture
- Tharparkar and Sialkot after the War
- 1993 – Traditional Architecture of Thatta
- 1997 – The Dual City: Karachi During the Raj (co-authored with her son, Mihail Lari)
- 1997 – The Jewel of Sindh: Samma Tombs on the Makli Hill (co-authored with her husband, Suhail Zaheer Lari)
- 2001 – Karachi: Illustrated City Guide (photography by her husband, Suhail Zaheer Lari)
- 2003 – Lahore: Illustrated City Guide

== Awards ==
In 2002, the Heritage Foundation received the U.N. Recognition Award from the United Nations for its efforts and results to promote cultural and historical conservation.

In 2006, Lari was awarded the Sitara-e-Imtiaz, one of the highest civil awards by the Government of Pakistan, in recognition of her services to the architectural profession and to heritage conservation of historical sites in the country.

In 2011, she received the Pakistani "1st Wonder Women of the Year Award".

In 2016, she received the Fukuoka Prize for Arts & Culture.

She has been awarded Jane Drew Prize 2020, raising the profile of women in architecture and design.

In 2021, the Politecnico di Milano awarded her the Laurea Magistrale ad Horonem in Architecture.

In 2022, she was appointed The Sir Arthur Marshall Professor of Sustainable Design in the Department of Architecture at the University of Cambridge.

In May 2023, she received the Honorary Doctorate in Design from Oxford Brooks University, where she graduated in 1964.

On 27 April 2023 RIBA announced her as the recipient of the 2023 Royal Gold Medal.

== Personal life ==
Yasmeen Lari lives in Karachi, Pakistan. She was married to Suhail Zaheer Lari who died in 2020 due to COVID-19. She has three children.

== See also ==
- Nader Khalili, Iranian architect
