= Ju Ming Museum =

Museum in Jinshan, New Taipei, Taiwan

Juming Museum
- 朱銘美術館
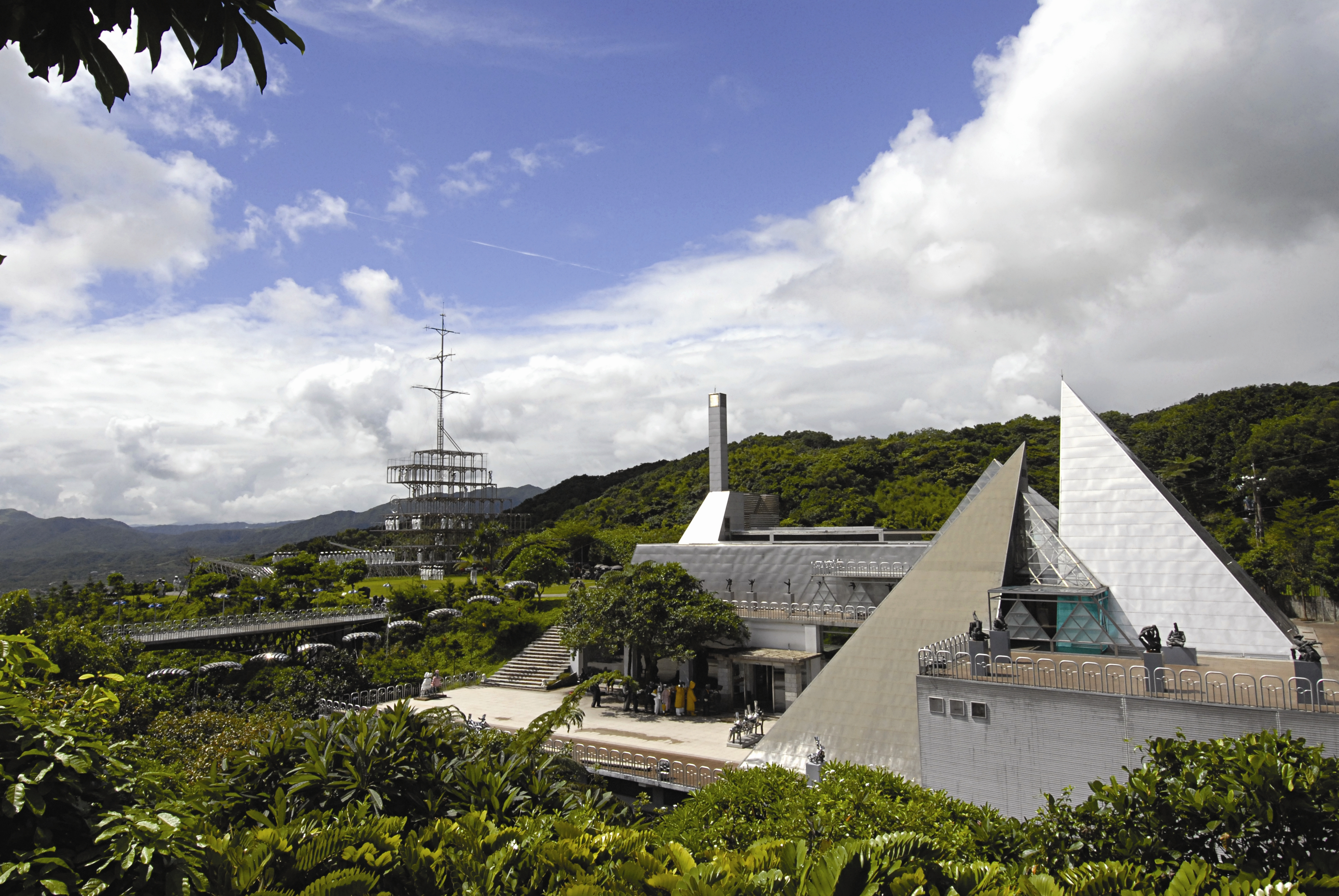
- Established: 19 September 1999
- Location: Jinshan, New Taipei City, Taiwan
- Coordinates: 25°14′47″N 121°36′40″E
- Type: museum
- Website: Official website

The Juming Museum (traditional Chinese: 朱銘美術館; simplified Chinese: 朱铭美术馆; pinyin: Zhū Míng Měishùguǎn) is a museum in Jinshan District, New Taipei City, Taiwan. It displays the works of Taiwanese sculptor Ju Ming.

== History ==
Initially purchased the building and the surrounding wasteland area for his personal art works collection storage in 1987, Ju Ming personally designed the architecture, landscapes, wiring and plumbing of the structure. Aside from purchasing the property to build the museum, he also donated over 2,000 pieces of his own works and personal collection to the museum for the public to view. Starting from the ground up, it took him 12 years to finish the construction work and he had turned a vacant land into a sculpture park. The museum officially opened on 19 September 1999. In 2017, the museum was lauded by the International Council of Museums.

== Architecture ==
The museum spans over an area of 11 hectares. The museum building was constructed with pyramid-shape and its outdoor area is divided into Taichi Plaza, Human World Square and Sport Square.

== Exhibitions ==
The museum exhibits Ju Ming's art works from 1987 to 1999, ranging from various painting exhibitions, sculpture and pottery exhibitions etc. for which he had showcased them before around the world. The museum is currently the largest outdoor art museum in Taiwan.

== See also ==
- List of museums in Taiwan
