= Heritage Foundation Pakistan =

Pakistani not-for-profit organisation

- Heritage Foundation of Pakistan
- Established: 1980
- Founders: Yasmeen Lari and Suhail Zaheer Lari
- Type: Nonprofit
- Legal status: incorporated under Section 42 of Companies Ordinance 1984
- Location: Karachi, Pakistan
- Coordinates: 24.8230817°N 67.0509557°E
- Board of directors: Yasmeen Lari; Afroza Bhamani; Shaha Jamshed; Shakiel Zaheer Lari; Suhail Zaheer Lari; Hameed Mayet; Shanaz Ramzi
- Award: Recognition Award from the United Nations
- Website: www.heritagefoundationpak.org

Heritage Foundation of Pakistan is a Pakistani heritage and humanitarian aid organization founded by Yasmeen Lari and Suhail Zaheer Lari in 1980.

In 1984, when there were plans to demolish the historically significant Hindu Gymkhana, Karachi building because it had somewhat deteriorated due to lack of maintenance, Heritage Foundation Pakistan intervened to save it. After that, the building was designated as a Protected Sindh Cultural Heritage building and is still being used as a facility that houses the National Academy of Performing Arts .

== Awards ==
In 2002, the Heritage Foundation of Pakistan received the Recognition Award from the United Nations System in Pakistan for its commitment to "documentation and conservation of heritage and environment of traditional and historical centers of Pakistan."
