= Vernon Wesley Ruttan =

American economist

- Born: 1924
- Died: 2008 (aged 83–84)
- Occupation: Development economist

Vernon Wesley Ruttan (1924–2008) was a development economist at the University of Minnesota, where he was Regents Professor Emeritus in the Departments of Economics and Applied Economics. Ruttan's research focused on agricultural development, induced innovation, technical change and productivity growth, institutions, and development assistance policy. His book with Yujiro Hayami, Agricultural Development: An International Perspective (1971) was considered a classic in the field and was translated into four other languages.

== Education and early career ==
Ruttan received a B.A. at Yale University in 1948, an M.A. at the University of Chicago in 1950, and a Ph.D. at the University of Chicago in 1952.

At the University of Chicago, Ruttan studied with Theodore Schultz, who won the Nobel Memorial Prize in Economics in 1979.

Ruttan held positions earlier in his career at the Tennessee Valley Authority, Purdue University, the President's Council of Economic Advisors, the Rockefeller Foundation at the International Rice Research Institute in The Philippines, and President of the Agricultural Development Council.

== Induced Innovation and Agricultural Development ==
In the book, Agricultural Development: An International Perspective, Ruttan and Hayami outline their hypothesis as follows:

The [induced innovation] model attempts to make more explicit the process by which technical and institutional changes are induced through the responses of farmers, agribusiness entrepreneurs, scientists, and public administrators to resource endowments and to changes in the supply and demand of factors and products. The state of relative endowments and accumulation of the two primary resources, land and labor, is a critical element in determining a viable patterns of technical change in agriculture. Agriculture is characterized by much stronger constraints of land on production than most other sectors of the economy. Agricultural growth may be viewed as a process of easing the constraints on production imposed by inelastic supplies of land and labor. Depending on the relative scarcity of land and labor, technical change embodied in new and more productive inputs may be induced primarily either (a) to save labor or (b) to save land. (Hayami and Ruttan, 2nd ed., p. 4).

== Government investment in general purpose technology ==
In his book, Is War Necessary for Economic Growth? (2006), Ruttan argues that large scale and long term government investment is necessary for the development of general purpose technologies and economic growth. He analyzed the development of six different technology complexes and concluded that government investments have been important in speeding up the development of all of these, and that nuclear power would, most probably, not have been developed at all in the absence of large government investments in development.

The six technologies that were analyzed by Ruttan are:

- American production system
- airplane technologies
- space technologies
- IT technologies
- Internet technologies
- nuclear power

== Honors ==
Ruttan was a Fellow of the American Agricultural Economics Association, American Association for the Advancement of Science, and the American Academy of Arts and Sciences. He was elected as a member in the National Academy of Sciences in 1990.

Ruttan also received honorary degrees from Rutgers University, Purdue University, and Christian Albrechts University of Kiel. Ruttan received the U.S. Department of Agriculture Distinguished Service Award and the Alexander von Humboldt Award for outstanding contributions to agriculture.

On June 18, 2010, the University of Minnesota renamed Classroom Office Building on the St. Paul campus to Ruttan Hall

== Books ==
- Agricultural Policy in an Affluent Society (with Arley Waldo and James Houck). Norton Press, 1969.
- Agricultural Development: An International Perspective (with Yujiro Hayami). Baltimore, The Johns Hopkins Press, 1971 (1st ed.) and 1985 (2nd ed.)
- Resource Allocation and Productivity in National and International Research (with Thomas Arndt and Dana Dalrymple). University of Minnesota Press, 1977.
- Induced Innovation: Technology, Institutions, and Development (with Hans Binswanger). Baltimore, The Johns Hopkins Press, 1978
- The Role of Demand and Supply in the Generation and Diffusion of Technical Change (with Colin Thirtle). London: Harwood Academic Publishers, 1987.
- Aid and Development (with Anne Osborn Krueger and C. Michaelopolous). Baltimore, The Johns Hopkins Press, 1989.
- Why Food Aid? (Ed.) Baltimore, The Johns Hopkins Press, 1993.
- United States Development Assistance Policy: The Domestic Politics of Foreign Economic Aid. Baltimore, The Johns Hopkins Press, 1996.
- Technology, Growth, and Development: An Induced Innovation Perspective. Oxford University Press, 2001.
- Social Science Knowledge and Economic Development: An Institutional Design Perspective. Ann Arbor, MI: University of Michigan Press, 2003.
- Is War Necessary for Economic Growth?: Military Procurement and Technology Development New York: Oxford University Press, 2006. [available in short form through the lecture PDF of the same title]

== Selected journal articles ==
The following articles by Ruttan and his colleagues were the most frequently cited in his career, according to Google Scholar.

- Hayami, Yujiro and Vernon W. Ruttan. "Toward a Theory of Induced Institutional Innovation," Journal of Development Studies, 20(1984): 203–223.
- Hayami, Yujiro and Vernon W. Ruttan. "Agricultural Productivity Differences Among Countries," American Economic Review, 60(1970): 895–911.
- Evenson, R., P.E. Waggoner, and V.W. Ruttan. "Economic Benefits from Research: An Example from Agriculture," Science, 205(1979): 1101–1107.
- Ruttan, Vernon W. "Induced Innovation, Evolutionary Theory and Path Dependence: Sources of Technical Change," Economic Journal, 107(1997): 1520–1529.
- Ruttan, Vernon W. "The New Growth Theory and Development Economics: A Survey," Journal of Development Studies, 35(1998): 1-26.
- Kawagoe, T., Y. Hayami, and V, Ruttan. "The Intercountry Agricultural Production Function and Productivity Differences Among Countries," Journal of Development Economics, 17(1985): 113–132.
- Ruttan, Vernon W. "The Green Revolution: Seven Generalizations," International Development Review, 19(1977): 16–23.
- Ruttan, Vernon W. "Usher and Schumpeter on Invention, Innovation, and Technological Change," Quarterly Journal of Economics, 73(1959): 596–606.
- Ruttan, Vernon W. "Productivity Growth in World Agriculture: Sources and Constraints," Journal of Economic Perspectives, 16(2002): 161–184.
- Ruttan, Vernon W. "What Happened to Technology Adoption-Diffusion Research?" Sociologia Ruralis, 36(1996): 51–73.
