= John Reid (diplomat) =

New Zealand lawyer and diplomat (1901–1985)

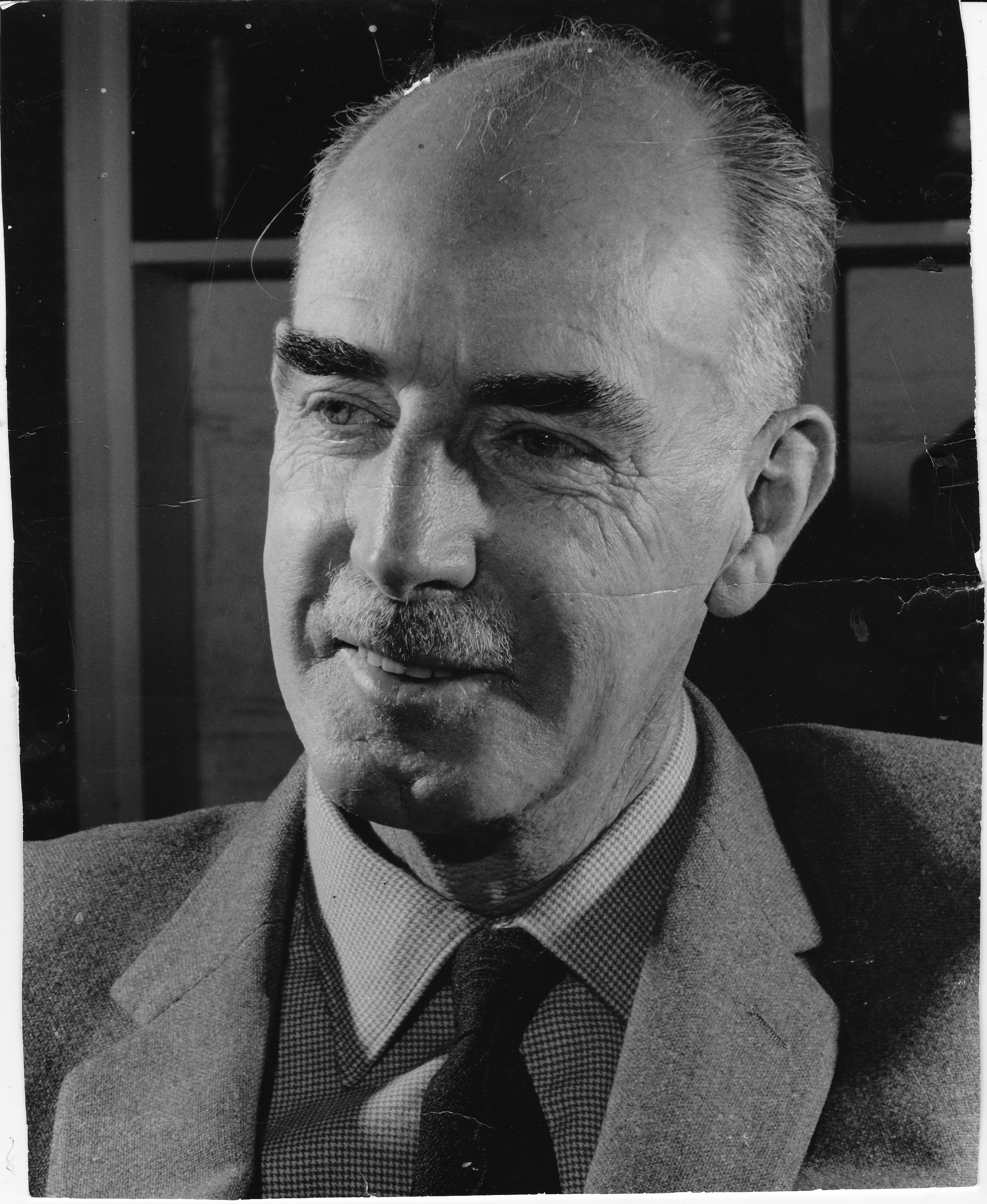

John Stanhope Reid (25 March 1901 – 24 August 1985) was a New Zealand lawyer, public servant and diplomat. He served as first United Nations Resident Representative in Indonesia (1952–53), and New Zealand Ambassador to Tokyo (1956-61) and High Commissioner to Canada (1961–64).

== Early life ==
John Reid was born in the then largely working-class Lower Hutt suburb of Petone, the eldest of five children of Scottish-born John Reid (1874-1950), a worker in the nearby Railway Workshops, and Alice, née Bernard (1876-1953), New Zealand-born grand-daughter of an Anglo-Irish Church of Ireland clergyman. He was among the first from Petone to achieve a university degree, studying law part-time at Victoria University College while working in the Crown Law Office. He graduated and began practising law in 1923, initially in Christchurch, and then in Marton, Taihape and Putaruru, before opening his own practice in Lower Hutt in 1927. On 6 October 1926 he married Wellington schoolteacher Doris Aileen Priestley (1900-1987), born in Cleethorpes, Lincolnshire, from a long line of Methodist clergy.

== Drafting social welfare legislation ==
During the Great Depression of 1929-35, John Reid assisted the Labour member of Parliament for the Hutt, Walter Nash, in his regular Sunday clinics to assist the unemployed and destitute. When the Labour Party swept to power in the 1935 election, Walter Nash became Finance Minister, with overall responsibility for implementing the ambitious Labour platform of social welfare. He soon began calling on John Reid to assist in the drafting of the enabling legislation, and encouraged him to join the Public Service as Assistant Law Draftsman in 1938. As a key member of the committee tasked with devising for Nash an affordable universal pension scheme, he wrote a much-cited summary to Nash on 23 March 1938 outlining a universal pension of 10 shillings a week at 65, and a means-tested pension of 30 shillings at 60 for those unable to provide for themselves. Keith Sinclair argues that it was "this suggestion made initially by John S. Reid", that "laid the basis for the first universal pension scheme in the world". The scheme was built into the Social Security Act of 1938.

== Opening the Washington legation ==
World War II convinced New Zealand (like Australia) that it could no longer depend exclusively on Britain for its protection and foreign policy, but urgently needed representation in the U.S.. Lacking experienced personnel, the Government appointed workaholic Walter Nash himself as its first Minister to Washington in late 1941, while keeping his other roles in Cabinet. He asked John Reid to accompany him during his first period in Washington (January 1942 to April 1943) but Reid declined to leave his large family in the middle of a threatening war. On the second, in December 1943, he agreed to go as First Secretary with special responsibility for the economic relations with the U.S. through Lend-Lease. The appointment was seen as irregular by the Opposition, which questioned it in the New Zealand Parliament, but also by Alister McIntosh, the new Secretary of the Department of External Affairs, constituted in June 1943. Only after Nash was replaced in July 1944 as Minister (later Ambassador) by Sir Carl Berendsen, McIntosh's former mentor in Wellington, who also found Reid essential, was he accepted as a permanent part of the diplomatic service. His four children were then able to join him and Aileen in Washington.

Reid was frequently in charge of the tiny mission in Washington, since both Nash and Berendsen were in demand for the constant round of post-war conferences, while Berendsen came to love the US lecture circuit. His most significant impact was in representing New Zealand on the UN Trusteeship Council in 1948, leading New Zealand to part company with the more defensive administering powers, on one occasion voting (with USSR) against Britain over its self-satisfied report on Tanganyika.

== Nudging New Zealand towards Asia ==
Back in Wellington, Reid was left to handle the ambitious Australia-initiated project that became the Colombo Plan, about which McIntosh and the government of the day were decidedly negative. At the Sydney planning meeting in May 1950, Reid was surprisingly elected to chair the preparatory committee of officials drafting a plan for Technical Assistance, despite New Zealand's reluctance to commit money to anything. Again surprisingly, he mediated the desire of the Asian delegations to see this fast-tracked effectively enough to have Technical Assistance emerge as the unexpected main event for immediate action, rather than the controversial Australian scheme for capital assistance on the model of the Marshall Plan in Europe. At the subsequent 'Consultative Committee' meeting in Colombo (Feb 1951), he chaired the drafting committee for the final report. He represented New Zealand at the other Colombo Plan and ECAFE meetings in 1950-52, presenting as positive a face as possible on New Zealand's then reluctance to incur responsibilities of any kind in Asia.

== United Nations tasks ==
These roles drew the attention of the UN's infant Technical Assistance Board, when in 1951-2 it was looking for a senior figure to represent it in Jakarta, who might be able to overcome the sensitivity of the nationalist government about taking advice from patronising neo-colonials. Reid took up the position in July 1952, as the UN's first Resident Representative in Indonesia. His final report, at the end of 1953, revealed the frustrations of trying to coordinate a range of independent-minded UN specialist organisations with the priorities of the Indonesian government.

In 1953, Reid was awarded the Queen Elizabeth II Coronation Medal.

In 1954 the UN Trusteeship Council entrusted Reid to chair its regular 3-yearly Visiting Mission to the Trust Territories in East Africa: - Tanganyika (assigned to Britain), Ruanda and Urundi (Belgium) and Somaliland (Italy). In this case he found himself in a conservative minority of one over the issue of demanding a rapid timetable for independence. In relation to Ruanda-Urundi Reid "feared there would be violent outbreaks" between Tutsi and Hutu unless the Belgians adopted a very different strategy before independence. Ramon Sears, representing the US, created a majority on several of these issues by joining the more anti-colonial members from India and El Salvador. Sears was, however, overruled by the State Department, and the Trusteeship Council at its meeting in December 1954 incorporated the Reid minority report into the official report of the mission.

== Diplomatic posts ==
In 1956 Reid was posted to Tokyo as New Zealand's first Minister to Japan, with the post upgraded to Ambassador in 1958. A highlight was the first (Junior) All Black tour of Japan in 1958, a big moment in Japan rugby which saw Reid become Patron of the Rugby Union of Japan. He was also able to host his old friend Walter Nash, making the first New Zealand Prime Ministerial visit to Japan. In 1961 he was posted as High Commissioner to Canada. Health concerns of himself and his wife dictated an early retirement and return to Wellington in 1964. Among various retirement tasks was as President of the Walter Nash Vietnam Memorial Appeal, which succeeded in building a children's hospital at Qui Nhon, South Vietnam, in the late 1960s.
