= Ju Ming =

Taiwanese artist (1938–2023)

- 朱銘
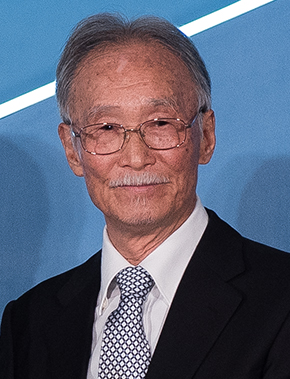
- Ming in 2017
- Born: 20 January 1938; Miaoli, Shinchiku, Taiwan, Empire of Japan
- Died: 22 April 2023 (aged 85); Shilin, Taipei City, Taiwan
- Other name: Jiu Er
- Occupation: Sculptor

Ju Ming
- Traditional Chinese: 朱銘
- Simplified Chinese: 朱铭
Transcriptions
Standard Mandarin
- Hanyu Pinyin: Zhū Míng
- Wade–Giles: Chu^{1} Ming^{2}
- IPA: [ʈʂú mǐŋ]

Ju Ming (Chinese: 朱銘; pinyin: Zhū Míng; 20 January 1938 – 22 April 2023) was a Taiwanese sculptor who attained fame in his native country in the 1970s, and then in New York City in 1983. Ju was trained as a woodcarver, and apprenticed to Lee Chinchuan as a teenager. He developed his skill and applied it to a range of media, including bronze, styrofoam, ceramics, and stainless steel.

In 1959, Ju moved back to Tunghsiao and opened his own studio with apprentices, creating a successful crafts business that left him dissatisfied. Ju became more artistic and tried innovative techniques. He married Chen Fu-mei, also from Tunghsiao, three years later.

After winning several awards in the prestigious Taiwan Provincial Art Exhibition, Ju felt that he could only develop further as a sculptor if he re-apprenticed himself, this time to Yang Yuyu, who himself had only just returned from a three-year art scholarship in Rome. Yang agreed, impressed by "Ju's flowing lines through the natural grain of the wood, the form executed with such an assured gentleness and humility."

In 1976, Ju took up tai chi on Yang's advice to develop physical and mental discipline. He developed greatly from this practice and started thinking about sculpting works on the theme of tai chi, which had never been done before. Ju's solo exhibition occurred in March at the National Museum of History in Taipei due to Yang Yu-yu convincing the museum authorities to show his student's pieces. It was highly successful and he was named as one of the Ten Outstanding Youths of 1976.

From 1980, Ju continued to gain international acclaim and exhibited abroad. He started The Living World "family", which he continued to expand. These bright figures are made of bronze, stainless steel, painted wood, foam rubber and cast bronze, giving him the freedom to depict the human form in all its varieties. Another is Ju's Living World series, depicting figures drawn from a modern, westernized society. Much of his work is housed at the Ju Ming Museum, just outside Taipei. The museum was built at the artist's expense, and is open to the public. Ju was awarded the 18th Fukuoka Asian Culture Prize in 2007.

== Backgrounds and early life ==
Ju Ming was born in Tongxiao, Shinchiku Prefecture, Japanese-era Taiwan on 20 January 1938. His father is Ju Li Chi and his mother is Wang Ai. His original name is Ju Chuan Tai. As the youngest in his family, his childhood nickname is Jiu Er (九二), which means ninety-two in English, to dedicate his parents' added up ages as 92 when he was born.

Ju Ming was apprenticed to a local woodcarver, Lee Chin-chuan from the Temple of the Empress of Heaven when Ju was 15. He learned about woodcarving and painting during his apprenticeship, which set the foundation for his future career as a sculptor. Ju Ming mentioned that during that period, he did woodcarving during the days and practiced painting during the nights. He recalled that Lee Chin-chuan's saying, "If a sculptor does not know how to paint, it is like an architect who can build houses but does not know how to do blueprint design drawings." He believed if a sculptor wants to carve well, he or she has to know and do many sketches, and most importantly not just copying other people's style; otherwise, the person is just an artisan, not an artist.

In 1959, Ju finished his apprenticeship and opened his own studio. He developed more carving experience and sharpened his carving skills through the crafts business. In 1961, Ju married Chen Fu-mei who is the model of one of Ju's famous sculptures, A Girl Playing Sand (玩沙的女孩). He further started to develop his innovative techniques and explore different artistic approaches. He also started to participate in art competitions and then won several awards in the prestigious Taiwan Provincial Art Exhibitions such as 1966's work Attractive to Each Other (相悅) and next year's Long Separation (久別). In 1968, Ju Ming began working under fellow sculptor Yuyu Yang's tutelage.

Ju Ming became well known in the West during the late 1990s and early 2000s with pieces visible in England, Paris, and Luxembourg. However, in 2014, Ju Ming ceased almost all of his international activities, vanishing from the global art scene.

Ju died by suicide on 22 April 2023, at the age of 85. He was reported to have multiple chronic health issues, including high blood pressure and depression.

== Artworks ==
=== Living World series – Imprisonment ===
Imprisonment, the sculptural set created in 2009. The piece is made by stainless steel. Sculpted with Ju Ming's signature style, blocky and minimalist, the figures are reduced to the basic forms intentionally to embrace the inner spiritual qualities within the human bodies. The sculpture consists of steel cages and inside is two life-size figures carved in Styrofoam facing each other. The title of the series Living World suggests that the works are based on the artist's observation and reflection on people's contemporary life. The sculptures are the depiction of the world where people situated within. These are the examination of the human figures and even further reveal what are inside the human forms.

Unlike the previous Living World series that the human figures are in different shades of colours, Imprisonment's colour palette is narrowed down to black and white monotone. Its minimalist quality evokes the fundamental part of human quality- good and evil- with its connotation of a self-contained realm. Black-and-white usually associates with opposite meanings. It also forms a pair in a number of contexts through cultural history. In Ju Ming's work, the White symbolizes the goodness as opposed to the Black associates with viciousness. The monochrome in Imprisonment can simply be viewed as the connection with the classic black-and-white striped on prisoner's uniform. However, it also connotes the Chinese yin-yang philosophy that good and evil within the human nature in fact are interrelated to one another. In Ju's concept, there is no existence of pure innate good and pure innate evil. Human kinds are combination of two qualities. One's value as a person is rooted in one's very self. Good and evil, black and white, could be interconnected or interdependent. The choices people make in their life define their qualities.

Through the sculptural set which symbolizes the ideas of "imprisoning others, being imprisoned by others, and self-imprisonment", the artists demonstrate that the subtle distinction between freedom and limit are in fact controlled by one's thoughts of imprisoning. The cage of the sculptures is locked from the inside with the key inside the lock. The figures inside the cage eventually could have freed themselves. The scenario shows that people are in fact self-imposed to be locked. Though life is more complicated and interconnected and cannot be simply defined to binary choices; the artist just tries to point out that lock or unlock, freedom or limit, good or evil are actually done by human's own choices.

The Chinese character (囚), stands for imprison, is compound with the character for human (人) in the middle of a cube surrounded by four walls (囗). Ju Ming used the literal and external form of a cage to represent the inner spiritual dimension of the idea of restraint of men. With the physical presentation of limit of freedom, Ju wants to point out that the invisible prison in our society. These prisons could be the norms of culture, the laws of institution, the confined architectural spaces of urban city, the curriculums of education, as well as the deep, rooted system thinking of humanity as whole. Ju Ming reproduced the humanity's cages and exploring our relationships with the cages we build.

== Awards and honors ==
- 1966– Attractive to Each Other. Ju was awarded the excellence-for-sculpture prize at the 21st Taiwan Art Exhibition.
- 1967– Long Separation. Ju was awarded third prize for sculpture in the 22nd Taiwan Art Exhibition.
- 1976 Arts Award from the Chinese Cultural Arts Association.
- 1976 Recognized as one of the Ten Outstanding Young Persons from Taiwan by the Junior Chamber of Commerce International.
- 1976 The National Award of Literature and Arts from the National Culture and Arts Foundation of Ministry of Education.
- 1998 Accolades for a life's work and his contributions to the arts from Fok Yin Tung Award From The Fok Yin Tung Foundation Of Hong Kong.
- 2000 Ju Ming Museum won the 14th Tokyo Creative Award, Foreign Award.
- 2002 The Enku Grand Award in Gifu, Japan.
- 2003 An Honorary Degree of Doctor of Art At Fu Jen Catholic University at Taipei.
- 2004 The Lifetime Executive Yuan Cultural Award. The Executive Yuan Cultural Award is to honor a person who has made special contributions towards maintaining or enhancing culture. It is a lifetime achievement award, and the highest award in Taiwan for a cultural figure. The President of the Executive Yuan, You Si-Kun, awarded the medal and certificate to Ju Ming. He also lauded the way Ju Ming had turned his life experience into artistic achievement, combining life and art and integrating art and culture into life through his works. We can feel Ju Ming's curiosity and love of life in his works. Chen Ci-Nan praised Ju Ming as "a genuine and unique world artist from the land of Taiwan. "This award," he went on, was to salute "the leader of the world of sculpture."
- 2007 The 18th Fukuoka Asian Culture Prize, Art and Cultures Prize.

== Exhibitions ==
- 1976 Individual Exhibition at the National Museum of History, Taipei.

Ju received high praise for his first woodcarving exhibition at the National Museum of History from both traditionalists and avant-garde artists. The China Times newspaper introduced him to its readership in a series of special articles published over five days. On the strength of this exhibition, Ju Ming became an important symbol of the Taiwan Nativist Movement in the 1970s.

- 1977 Individual exhibition at the Tokyo Central Art Museum, Tokyo
- 1978 Individual exhibition at the Tokyo Central Art Museum, Tokyo
- 1978 Solo exhibition at the Spring Gallery, Taipei
- 1980 Solo exhibition at the Hong Kong Arts Center, Hong Kong.

Ju Ming's exhibition sent an unprecedented shock through the Hong Kong art world. Reporters from cultural and education newspapers dash back and forth in the art center looking for Ju Ming. Three television stations invite him onto the air. ("Ju Ming's Shock" by Shih Shu-Cing)

- 1981 Individual Exhibition at the National Museum of History, Taipei
- 1981 Individual Exhibition at the Max Hutchinson Gallery, New York

Took his creative work to New York, his first international exposure. The result was an exhibit in the Max Hutchinson Gallery, New York, that was called a miracle by the head of the gallery. The Living World Series gradually took shape.

- 1983 Individual Exhibition at the Max Hutchinson Gallery, New York
- 1984 Individual Exhibition at the Ayala Museum, Manila
- 1984 Individual Exhibition at the Bhirasri Institute of Modern Art, Bangkok
- 1985 Solo Exhibition at the Max Hutchinson Gallery, New York
- 1986 Solo Exhibition in Exchange Square, Hong Kong
- 1986 Solo Exhibition at the Singapore History Museum (the old National Museum of Singapore), Singapore
- 1987 Solo Exhibition at the Taipei Fine Arts Museum, Taipei
- 1988 Solo Exhibition at the National Taiwan Museum of Fine Arts (the old Taiwan Museum of Art), Taichung
- 1989 Solo Exhibition at the Phyllis Kind Gallery, New York
- 1991 Solo Exhibition at the Hong Kong Arts Center, Hong Kong
- 1991 Solo Exhibition at the Southbank Center, London

_{First Chinese exhibition at the Southbank Center, one of only three large outdoor sculpture exhibitions in the ten years since its founding, and the only Asian artist invited. The Times of London writes, "Though we have been late in finding out about Ju Ming, now that we know him, we won't forget him."}

- 1991 Exhibition at Browns Gallery, London
- 1991 Solo Exhibition at the Yorkshire Sculpture Park, London
- 1991 Solo Exhibition at the Shin Kong Mitsukoshi Department Stores, Taipei
- 1991 Solo Exhibition at the Musée d'Art Contemporain de Dunkerque, France

Dunkerque Modern Arts Association Chairman G. Delaine describes the work "Living World Series—Parachute": "The strength of these sculptures does not lie merely in the dimensions of their figures; it is in the life force set free by them. These warrior gestures make us think they are about to overthrow their opponents in a single swift move."

- 1992 Individual Exhibition at the Hanart TZ Gallery, Taipei
- 1992 Exhibition at the Nippon International Contemporary Art Fair (NICAF), Yokohama
- 1992 Individual Exhibition at the Taipei Fine Arts Museum, Taipei
- 1992 Exhibition at the ART ASIA－International Fine Art Expositions, Hong Kong
- 1993 Exhibition at the Shinjuku Mitsukoshi Department Stores, Tokyo
- 1994 Exhibition at the Glory Sculpture Park, Hsinchu, Taiwan
- 1995 Retrospective Show at the Hakone Open-Air Museum, Japan

_{The oldest outdoor sculpture museum in Asia, the Hakone Open-Air Museum, held a retrospective exhibition for Ju Ming as the highest point in its 25-year anniversary.}

- 1995 Exhibition at the ART ASIA－International Fine Art Expositions, Hong Kong
- 1997 Exhibition at the Place Vendôme, Paris, France.

This exhibition is staged by the city council of Paris. Only very few famous artists, such as Dali, have exhibited there. This Paris exhibition demonstrates the extent to which Ju Ming's artistic reputation has grown.

- 1999 Luxembourg Individual Exhibition, Luxembourg
- 1999 Brussels Individual Exhibition, Belgium
- 2003 Exhibition in Berlin, Germany
- 2004 Exhibition at the Museum of fine Art, Gifu, Japan
- 2004 Exhibition at the Singapore Museum of Fine Arts, Singapore
- 2005 Displays the Living World Series－the Armed Forces, Taipei
- 2005 Civic and Municipal Affairs Bureau Exhibition, Macao
- 2006 Exhibition at the National Taiwan Museum of Fine Arts, Taichung
- 2006 Exhibition at the National Art Museum of China, Beijing

Ju Ming's first exhibition in China displays 62 pieces from the Taichi Series. It covers his development from the wood-carved Taichi of 1970 to the Taichi Arch in 2000.

- 2006 Time Square Individual Exhibition, Hong Kong
- 2006 Montreal Individual Exhibition, Canada
- 2009 Grand Presenting of Living World Series –Scientist, Taipei
- 2009 Grand Presenting of Living World Series –Swimming, Taipei
- 2014 Solo Exhibition "Ju Ming — Sculpting the Living World" at Hong Kong Museum of Art, Hong Kong

== Gallery ==
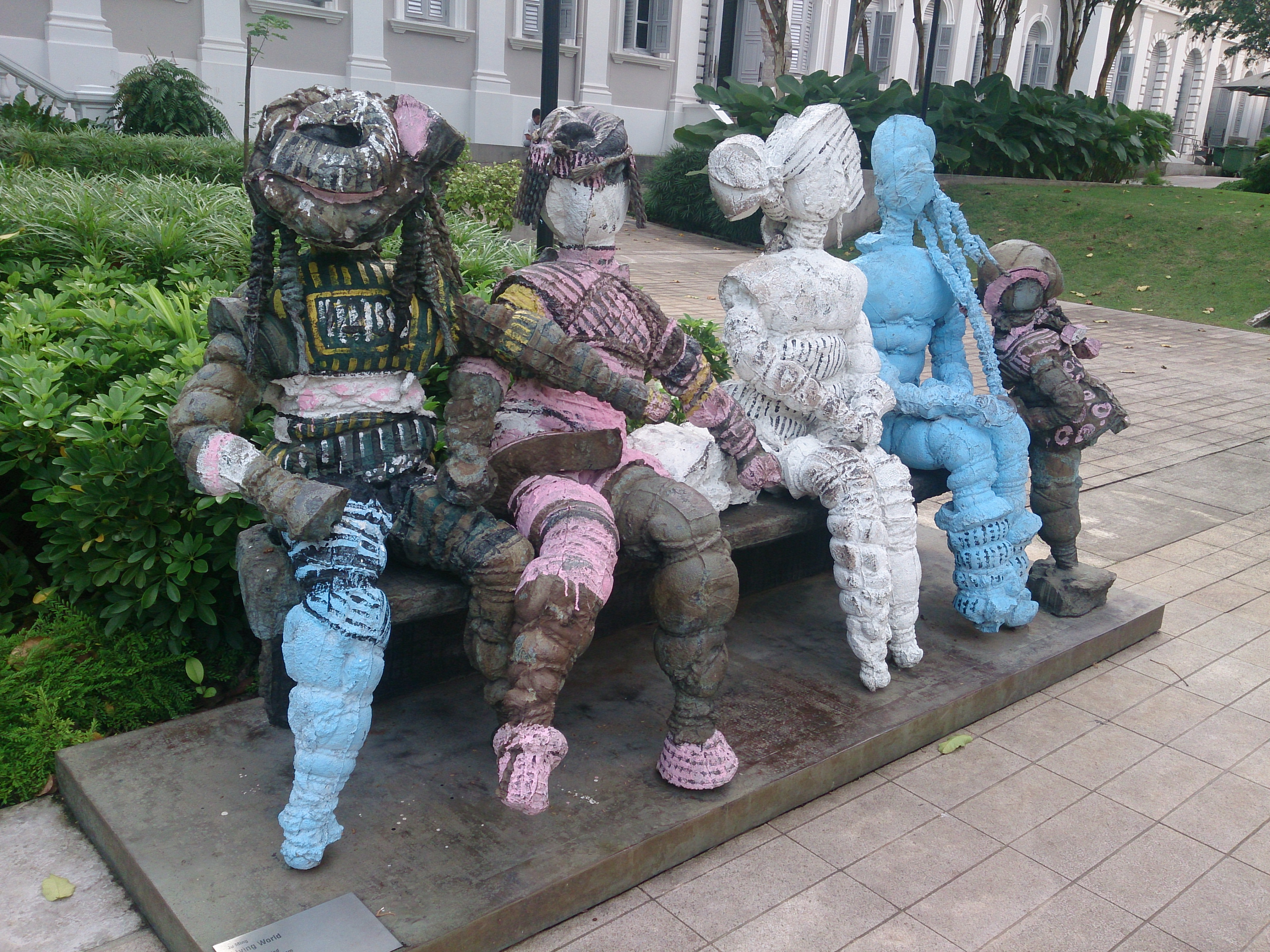
Living World by Ju Ming. Permanent outdoor exhibit at the National Museum of Singapore

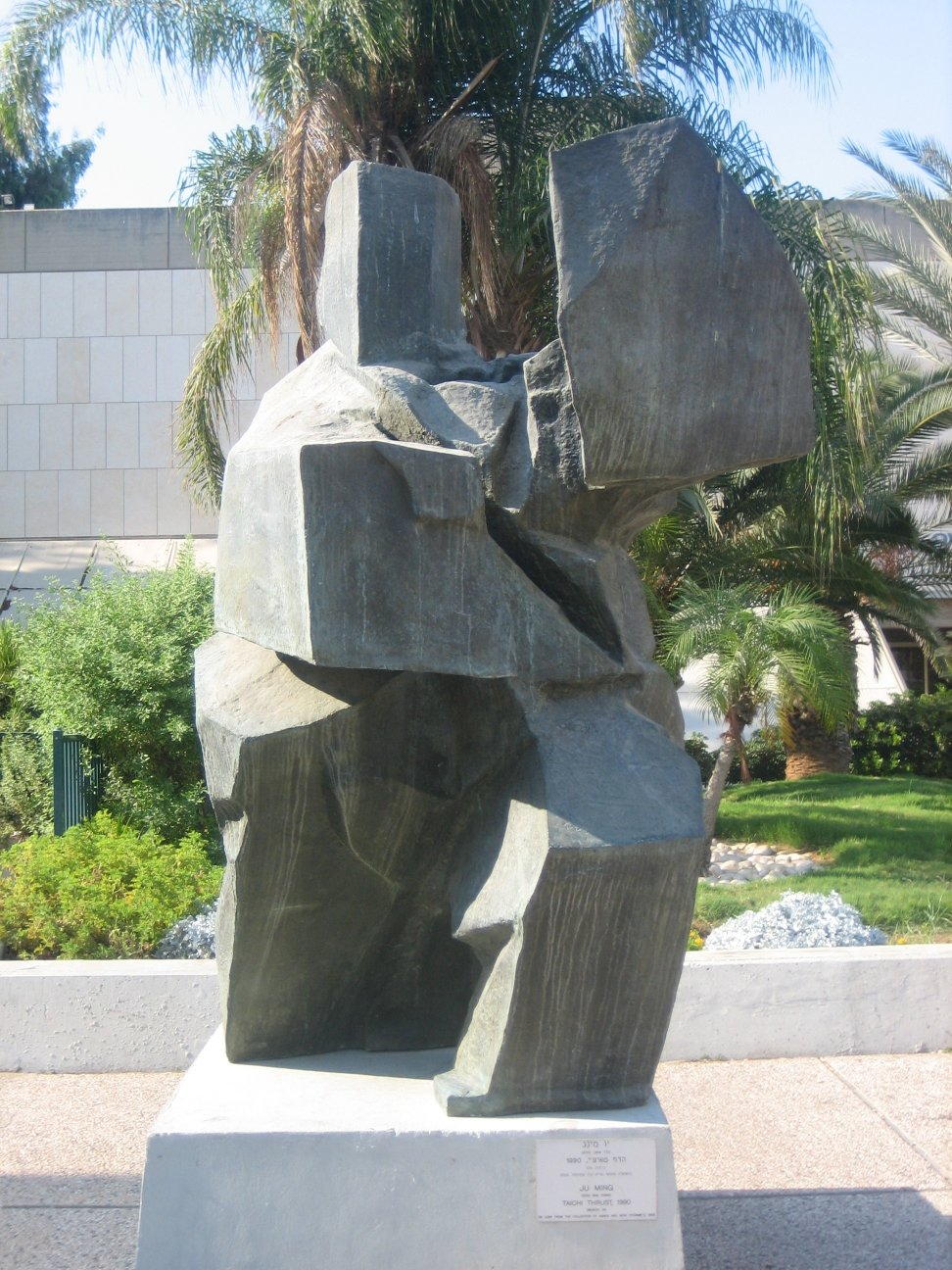
Taichi Thrust, bronze sculpture by Ju Ming, 1990, Tel Aviv Museum of Art, Tel Aviv, Israel

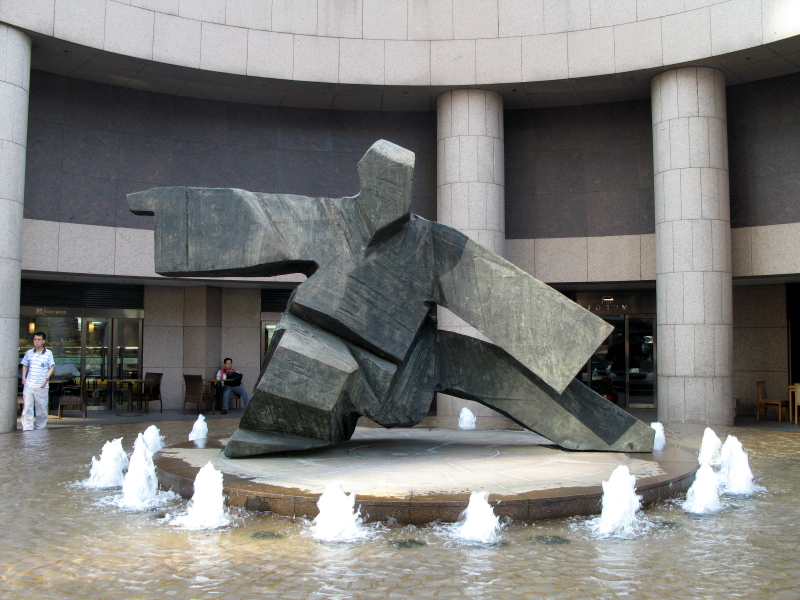
Statue in Exchange Square by Ju Ming

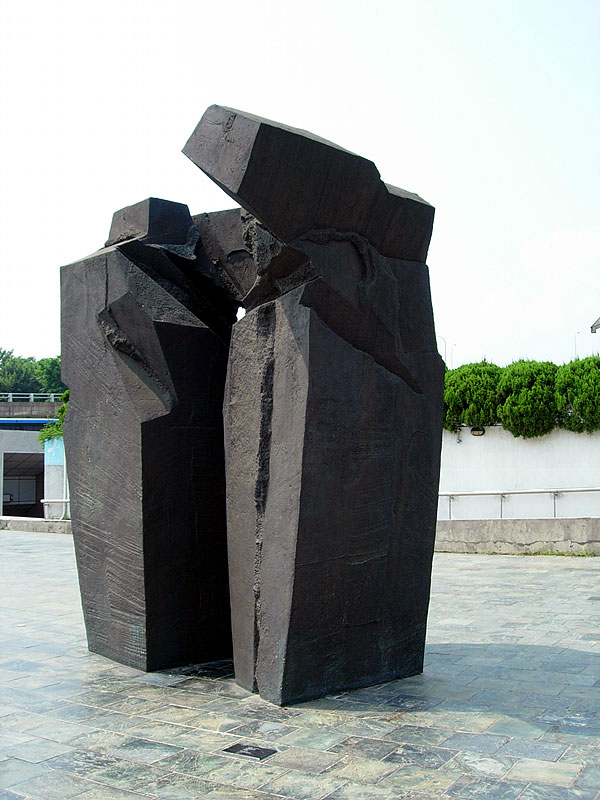
Taichi Arch by Ju Ming

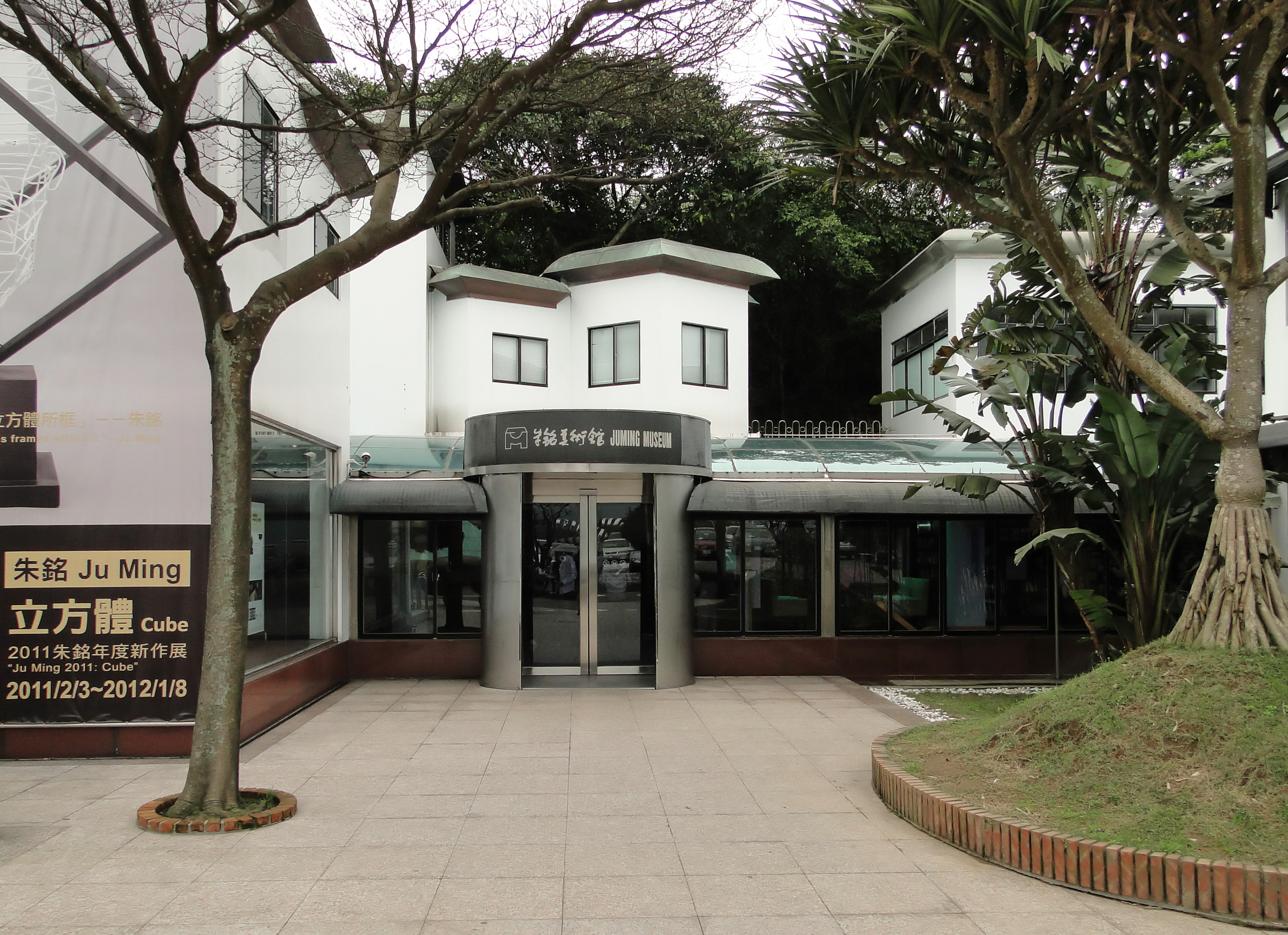
The Juming Museum

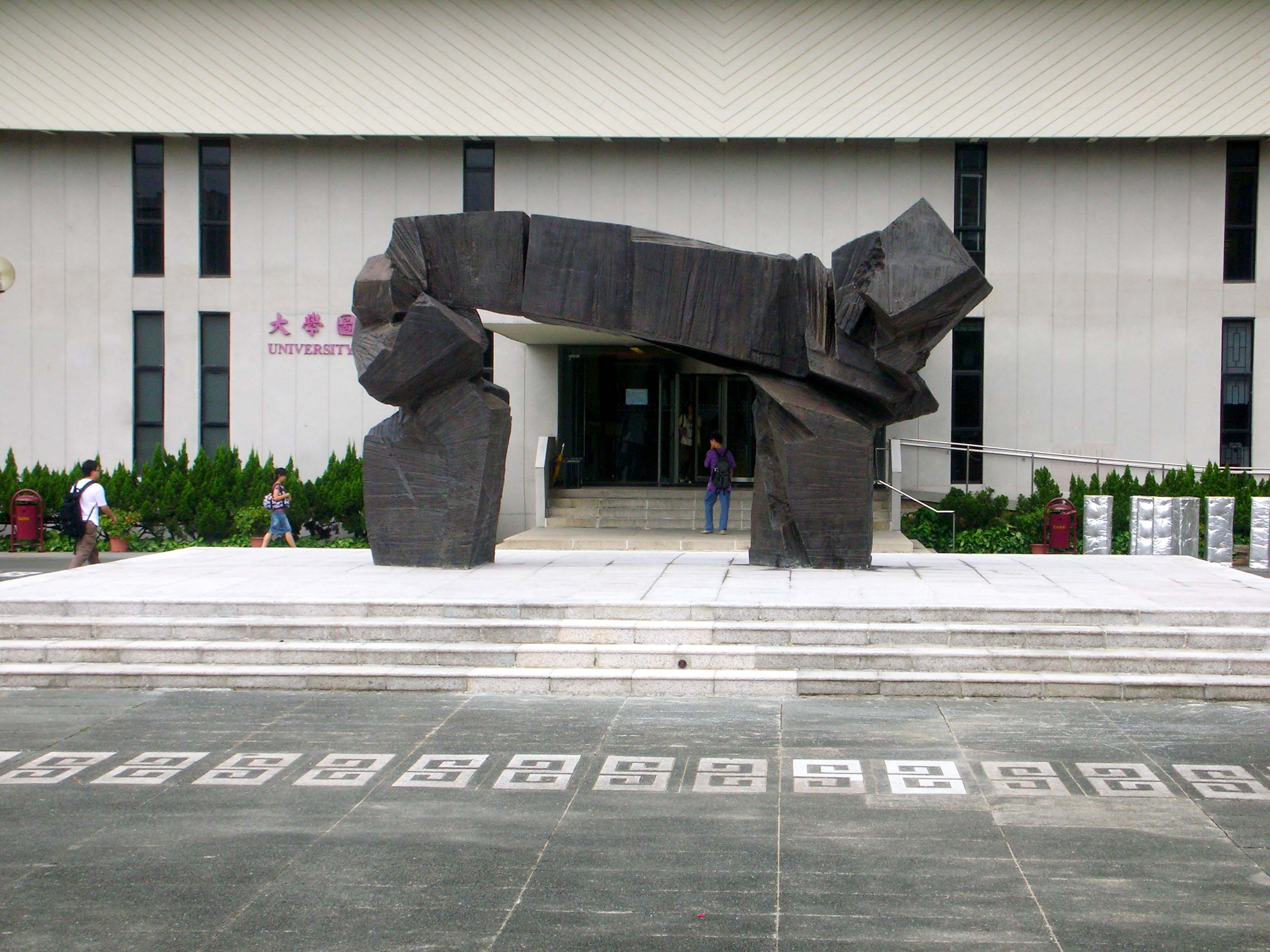
Gate of Wisdom at the Chinese University of Hong Kong

== See also ==
- Ju Ming Museum
- Tai Chi Single Whip, Victoria Square, Montreal
