= Fukuoka Prize =

Award given by the Fukuoka City International Foundation

- Awarded for: Outstanding individuals or groups/organizations in preserving and creating the unique and diverse cultures of Asia
- Country: Japan
- Presented by: Fukuoka City the Fukuoka City International Foundation (formerly The Yokatopia Foundation)
- First award: 1990
- Website: fukuoka-prize.org

The Fukuoka Prize (福岡アジア文化賞, Fukuoka Ajia Bunkashō) is an award established by the city of Fukuoka and the Fukuoka City International Foundation (formerly The Yokatopia Foundation) to honor the outstanding work of individuals or organizations in preserving or creating Asian culture. There are three prize categories: Grand Prize, Academic Prize, and Arts and Culture Prize.

In 1989, Fukuoka held the Asia-Pacific Exposition (referred to as "Yokatopia") with the concept of interaction between the Asia-Pacific region. The prize program was inaugurated in the following year to carry on the spirit of the Expo, and ever since then, the prizes have been given annually, and the related official events, including the award ceremony and the public forums by the prize winners, have been held every September, also known as "Asian Party" in Fukuoka. In 1999, school visits were added to the program, to give a special lecture to children by the prize winners.

== Prize categories ==
=== Grand Prize ===
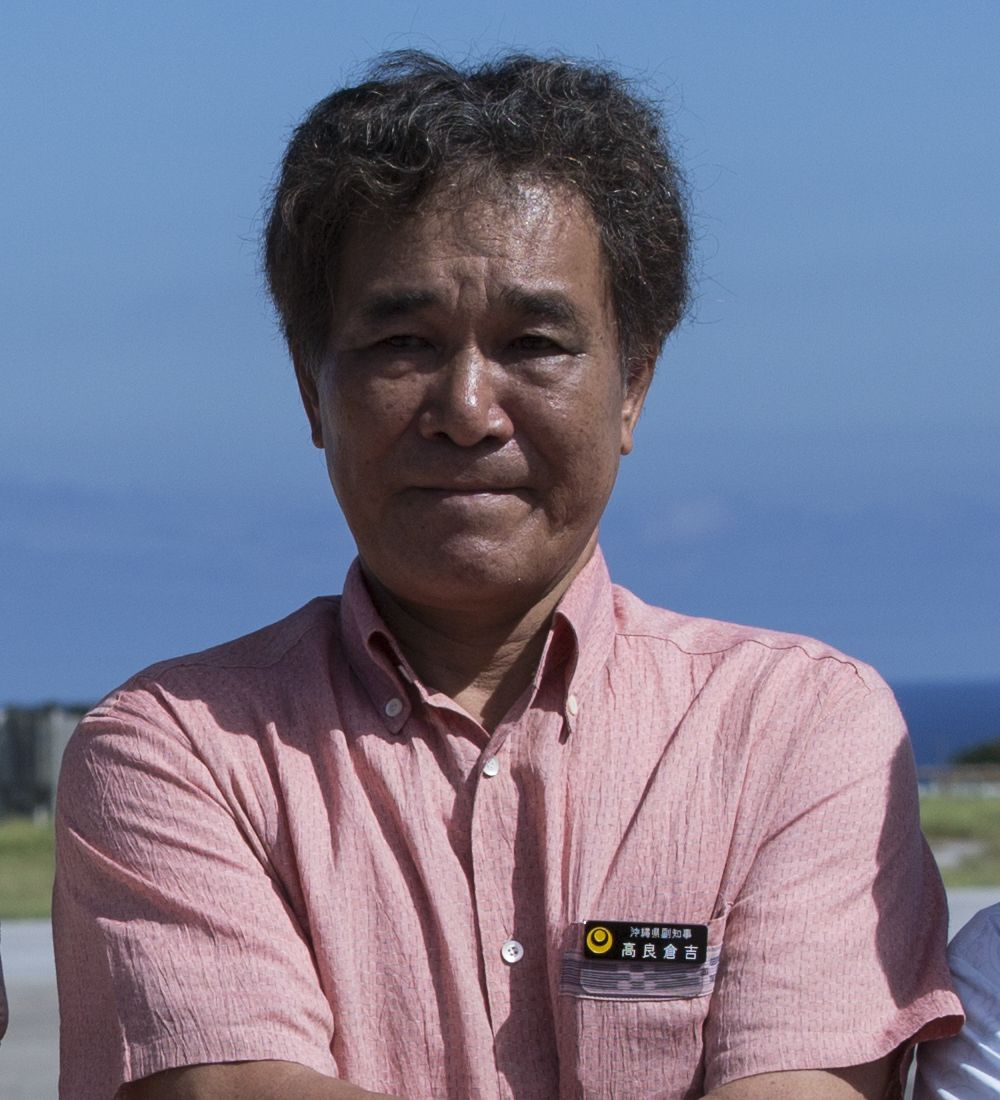
Kurayoshi Takara, the 2025 Grand Prize winner

To be presented to an individual or an organization in either the field of academics or arts and culture. The laureate must have made outstanding contributions to the preservation and creation of Asian culture and have exhibited the significance of Asian culture to the world. The prize is endowed with 5 million yen.

=== Academic Prize ===
To be presented to one or two individuals or organizations that have made outstanding achievements in the field of Asian studies, such as social and human sciences, contributing to the world’s understanding of Asia. The prize is endowed with 3 million yen.

=== Arts and Culture Prize ===
To be presented to one or two individuals or organizations who have made outstanding contributions in the diverse arts and culture of Asia. The category includes a wide range of fields such as the fine arts, literature, music, drama, dance, film, architecture, and so forth. The prize is endowed with 3 million yen.

== Geographical focus ==
It is limited to East, South, and Southeast Asia.

== List of recipients ==
Year	Category	Name	Nationality	Occupation
1990	Special	Ba Jin	China	Writer
1990	Special	Akira Kurosawa	Japan	Film director
1990	Special	Joseph Needham	United Kingdom	Scholar of Chinese science history
1990	Special	Kukrit Pramoj	Thailand	Writer, statesman
1991	Grand	Ravi Shankar	India	Sitar player
1991	Academic	Taufik Abudullah	Indonesia	Historian, social scientist
1991	Academic	Chie Nakane	Japan	Social anthropologist
1991	Arts & Culture	Donald Keene	United States	Scholar of Japanese literature & culture
1992	Grand	Kim Won-yong	South Korea	Archaeologist
1992	Academic	Clifford Geertz	United States	Anthropologist
1992	Academic	Minoru Takeuchi	Japan	Anthropologist
1992	Arts & Culture	Leandro V. Locsin	Philippines	Architect
1993	Grand	Fei Xiaotong	China	Sociologist, Anthropologist
1993	Academic	Ungku Abdul Aziz	Malaysia	Economist
1993	Academic	Jiro Kawakita	Japan	Scholar of ethnogeography
1993	Arts & Culture	Namjilyn Norovbanzad	Mongolia	Vocalist
1994	Grand	Manna Dey	India	Musician
1994	Academic	Wang Gungwu	Australia	Historian
1994	Academic	Yoneo Ishii	Japan	Scholar of Southeast Asian studies
1994	Arts & Culture	Padma Subrahmanyam	India	Traditional dancer
1995	Grand	Koentjaraningrat	Indonesia	Anthropologist
1995	Academic	Hahn Kiun	South Korea	Scholar of education
1995	Academic	Noboru Karashima	Japan	Historian
1995	Arts & Culture	Nam June Paik	United States	Video artist
1996	Grand	Wang Zhongshu	China	Archaeologist
1996	Academic	Phan Huy Lê	Vietnam	Historian
1996	Academic	Shinkichi Eto	Japan	Scholar of relations
1996	Arts & Culture	Nusrat Fateh Ali Khan	Pakistan	Qawwali singer
1997	Grand	Chheng Phon	Cambodia	Dramatist, artist
1997	Academic	Romila Thapar	India	Historian
1997	Academic	Takayasu Higuchi	Japan	Archaeologist
1997	Arts & Culture	Im Kwon-taek	South Korea	Film director
1998	Grand	Ki-Moon Lee	South Korea	Linguist
1998	Academic	Stanley Jeyaraja Tambiah	United States	Anthropologist
1998	Academic	Masaaki Ueda	Japan	Historian
1998	Arts & Culture	R. M. Soedarsono	Indonesia	Dancer, scholar of dance
1999	Grand	Hou Hsiao-hsien	Taiwan	Film director
1999	Academic	Taryo Obayashi	Japan	Ethnologist
1999	Academic	Nidhi Eoseewong	Thailand	Historian
1999	Arts & Culture	Tang Da Wu	Singapore	Visual artist
2000	Grand	Pramoedya Ananta Toer	Indonesia	Writer
2000	Academic	Than Tun	Myanmar	Historian
2000	Academic	Benedict Anderson	Ireland	Scholar of politics
2000	Arts & Culture	Hamzah Awang Amat	Malaysia	Shadow play master
2001	Grand	Muhammad Yunus	Bangladesh	Economist
2001	Academic	Yujiro Hayami	Japan	Economist
2001	Arts & Culture	Thawan Duchanee	Thailand	Painter
2001	Arts & Culture	Marilou Diaz-Abaya	Philippines	Film director
2002	Grand	Zhang Yimou	China	Film director
2002	Academic	Kingsley Muthumuni De Silva	Sri Lanka	Historian
2002	Academic	Anthony Reid	Australia	Historian
2002	Arts & Culture	Lat	Malaysia	Cartoonist
2003	Grand	Shuzen Hokama	Japan	Scholar of Okinawan studies
2003	Academic	Reynaldo C. Ileto	Philippines	Historian
2003	Arts & Culture	Xu Bing	China	Artist
2003	Arts & Culture	Dick Lee	Singapore	Singer-songwriter
2004	Grand	Amjad Ali Khan	India	Sarod maestro
2004	Academic	Li Yining	China	Economist
2004	Academic	Ram Dayal Rakesh	Nepal	Scholar of folk culture studies
2004	Arts & Culture	Sembukuttiarachilage Roland Silva	Sri Lanka	Conservator
2005	Grand	Im Dongkwon	South Korea	Folklorist
2005	Academic	Thaw Kaung	Myanmar	Librarian
2005	Arts & Culture	Douangdeuane Bounyavong	Laos	Textile researcher
2005	Arts & Culture	Tashi Norbu	Bhutan	Traditional musician
2006	Grand	Mo Yan	China	Writer
2006	Academic	Shagdaryn Bira	Mongolia	Historian
2006	Academic	Takeshi Hamahita	Japan	Historian
2006	Arts & Culture	Uxi Mufti	Pakistan	Culture expert
2007	Grand	Ashis Nandy	India	Social and cultural critic
2007	Academic	Srisakara Vallibhotama	Thailand	Anthropologist, archaeologist
2007	Arts & Culture	Ju Ming	Taiwan	Sculptor
2007	Arts & Culture	Kim Duk-soo	South Korea	Traditional performing artist
2008	Grand	Ann Hui	Hong Kong	Film director
2008	Academic	Savitri Goonesekere	Sri Lanka	Legal scholar
2008	Academic	Shamsul Amri Baharuddin	Malaysia	Social anthropologist
2008	Arts & Culture	Farida Parveen	Bangladesh	Musician
2009	Grand	Augustin Berque	France	Cultural geographer
2009	Academic	Partha Chatterjee	India	Political scientist, historian
2009	Arts & Culture	Minoru Miki	Japan	Composer
2009	Arts & Culture	Cai Guo-Qiang	China	Contemporary artist
2010	Grand	Hwang Byungki	South Korea	Musician
2010	Academic	James C. Scott	United States	Political scientist, anthropologist
2010	Academic	Kazuko Mori	Japan	Scholar of contemporary China studies
2010	Arts & Culture	Ong Keng Sen	Singapore	Contemporary performance artist
2011	Grand	Ang Choulean	Cambodia	Ethnologist
2011	Academic	Cho Dong-il	South Korea	Literary scholar
2011	Arts & Culture	Niels Gutschow	Germany	Architect
2012	Grand	Vandana Shiva	India	Environmental philosopher
2012	Academic	Charnvit Kasetsiri	Thailand	Historian, political scientist
2012	Arts & Culture	Kidlat Tahimik	Philippines	Filmmaker
2012	Arts & Culture	G.R.Ay. Koes Moertiyah Paku Buwono	Indonesia	Dancer
2013	Grand	Tetsu Nakamura	Japan	Cross-cultural humanitarian, grassroots cooperation
2013	Academic	Tessa Morris-Suzuki	Australia	Asian studies scholar
2013	Arts & Culture	Nalini Malani	India	Contemporary artist
2013	Arts & Culture	Apichatpong Weerasethakul	Thailand	Filmmaker, visual artist
2014	Grand	Ezra F. Vogel	United States	Sociologist
2014	Academic	Azyumardi Azra	Indonesia	Historian
2014	Arts & Culture	Danny Yung	Hong Kong	Theatre artist
2015	Grand	Thant Myint-U	Myanmar	Historian
2015	Academic	Ramachandra Guha	India	Historian, sociologist
2015	Arts & Culture	Đặng Thị Minh Hạnh	Vietnam	Fashion designer
2016	Grand	A. R. Rahman	India	Musician, composer
2016	Academic	Ambeth R. Ocampo	Philippines	Historian
2016	Arts & Culture	Yasmeen Lari	Pakistan	Architect
2017	Grand	Pasuk Phongpaichit and Chris Baker	Thailand / United Kingdom	Economist, historian
2017	Academic	Wang Ming	China	Public management scholar
2017	Arts & Culture	Kong Nay	Cambodia	Musician
2018	Grand	Jia Zhangke	China	Filmmaker
2018	Academic	Akira Suehiro	Japan	Economist, area studies (Thailand)
2018	Arts & Culture	Teejan Bai	India	Folk musician
2019	Grand	Randy David	Philippines	Sociologist
2019	Academic	Leonard Blussé	Netherlands	Historian of Asian–European relations
2019	Arts & Culture	Makoto Satō	Japan	Theatre director
2021	Grand	Palagummi Sainath	India	Journalist
2021	Academic	Kishimoto Mio	Japan	Historian
2021	Arts & Culture	Prabda Yoon	Thailand	Writer, creative artist
2022	Grand	Eitetsu Hayashi	Japan	Musician
2022	Academic	Timon Screech	United Kingdom	Art historian
2022	Arts & Culture	Shahzia Sikander	United States	Visual artist
2023	Grand	Thongchai Winichakul	Thailand	Historian
2023	Academic	Khatharya Um	United States	Political scientist
2023	Arts & Culture	Zhang Lü	China	Filmmaker
2024	Grand	Daito Manabe	Japan	Media artist
2024	Academic	Sunil Amrith	United States	Historian
2024	Arts & Culture	Kimsooja	South Korea	Visual artist
2025	Grand	Kurayoshi Takara	Japan	Historian
2025	Academic	Baik Young-seo	South Korea	Historian
2025	Arts & Culture	Vo Trong Nghia	Vietnam	Architect
2026	Grand	Ho Tzu Nyen	Singapore	Artist
2026	Academic	Caroline Hau	Philippines	Scholar of Southeast Asian Studies, Literature Critique, Writer
2026	Arts & Culture	Pichet Klunchun	Thailand	Dancer, Choreographer, Contemporary Artist
