= Midnight Sun Solar Race Team =

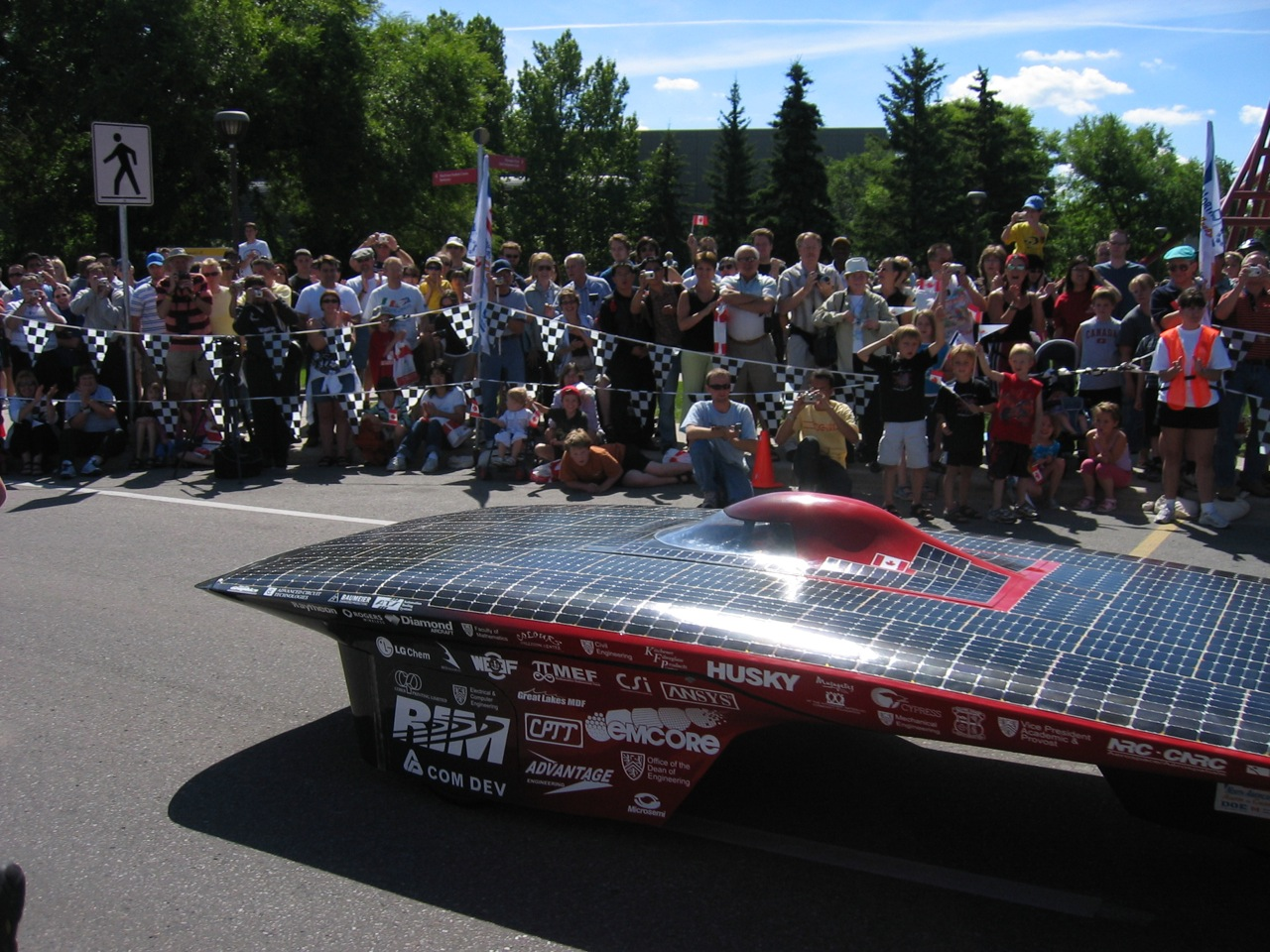
Midnight Sun Solar Rayce Car Team
Midnight Sun VIII, the team's 2005 car.
Established	1988
Affiliation	University of Waterloo
Industry	Solar Car Racing
Latest Vehicle	Midnight Sun XII
Website	uwmidsun.com

The Midnight Sun Solar Rayce Car Team is a Canadian solar car race team affiliated with the University of Waterloo of Waterloo, Ontario. Founded in 1988, the Midnight Sun team is a student-run organization which designs and builds a solar vehicle every two to three years to compete in two solar challenges; the World Solar Challenge, held in Australia, and the American Solar Challenge, held in the United States.

The Midnight Sun team's goal is to build a competitive solar car which will show design, innovation and teamwork amongst students at the University of Waterloo. Furthermore, they aim to educate the public on sustainable technologies, as well as explore the possibilities of solar energy applications for sustainable future.

== Background information ==
The aims of the team are to raise environmental awareness, develop interest in renewable energy, educate the public on the environment, and take part in local community events. The majority of funding for the solar cars come from internal and external sponsorship.

The name "Midnight Sun" comes from Midnight Sun, a natural phenomenon occurring north of the Arctic Circle and south of the Antarctic Circle during the summer months where the sun remains visible 24 hours a day. Based on the theory, this phenomenon would keep solar vehicles powered all day; making solar cars more effective and efficient for the environment compared to fossil fuels cars.

During Midnight Sun VII period, the team held the Guinness World Record for "Longest Journey by Solar Electric Vehicle". The trip took place from August 7 through September 14, 2004, the car travelled a total of 15,070 kilometres (9,360 mi) through the United States and Canada. The journey started at the university's Davis Centre, went through Vancouver, San Francisco, Houston, Florida, Washington DC, New York City, and Halifax before finishing at Parliament Hill in Ottawa.

In 2007, the solar car's prompted locals to phone radio stations that was an UFO driving on highway in two different occasions due to its unusual design. The team officially broke the record on August 26 when they crossed the border from California to Arizona. The previous record was held by Queen's University with a total of 7,044 kilometres (4,377 mi) travelled during July 2000.

Although the team's work on the car is not part of the school curriculum, some students can integrate class projects into the club. For example, all engineering undergraduates are required to do a senior design project; some engineers design parts for the car, submit them for marks, and then install them.

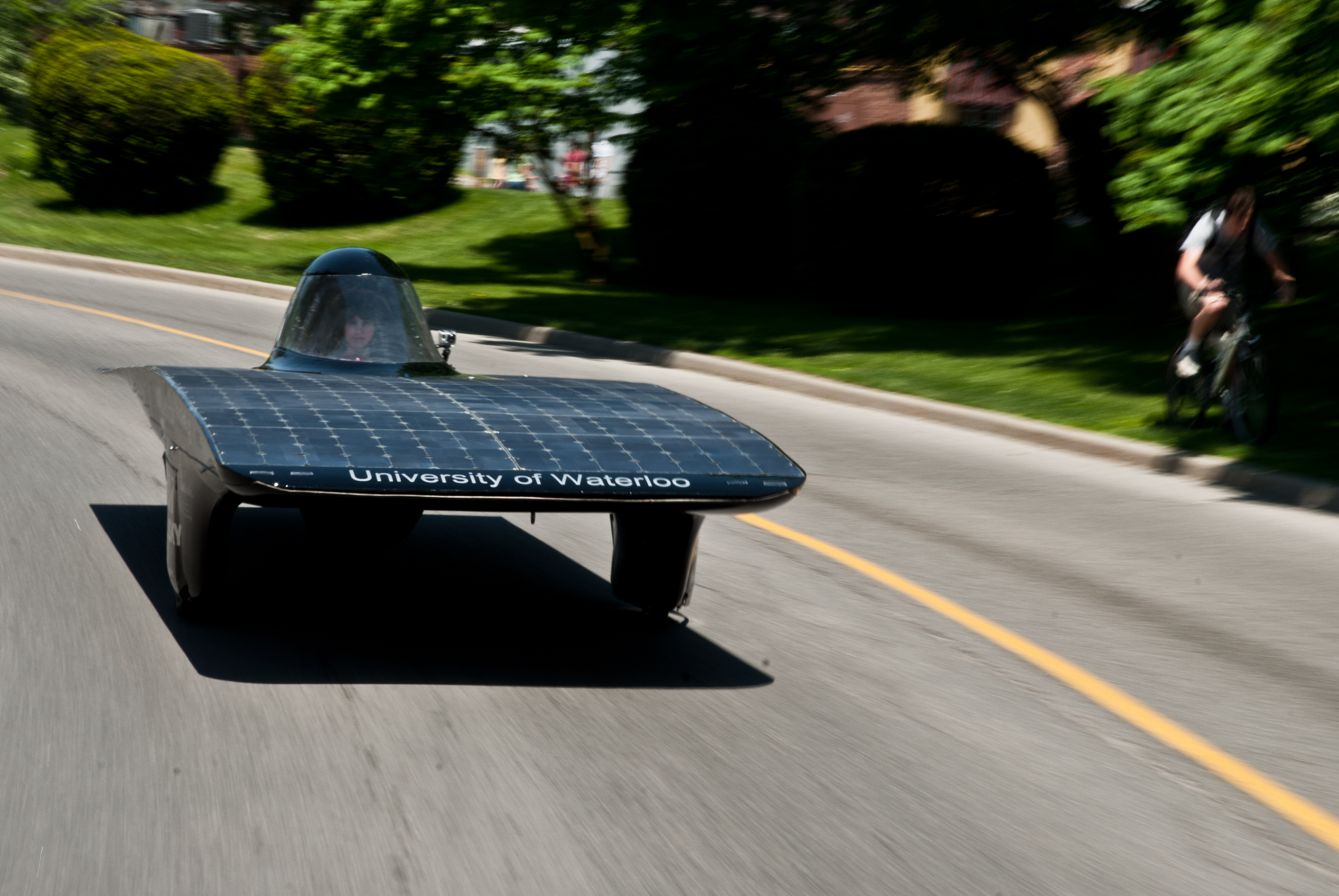
The Midnight Sun X taken for a test drive in June 2011.

== Model history ==
=== Midnight Sun I to Midnight Sun V ===
The club's first vehicle was not a solar car, but a solar bicycle; dubbed Midnight Sun Zero which the team presented to then-Prime Minister Brian Mulroney. The team's first solar car, Midnight Sun I was completed during 1990 and competed in the 1990 GM Sunrayce USA (now known as the American Solar Challenge) and finished 24th.

Midnight Sun II competed in Sunrayce 93, which ran from Dallas to Minneapolis and finished 33rd.

Midnight Sun III raced in Sunrayce 95 from Indianapolis to Denver and finished 20th overall.

Midnight Sun IV came 7th overall out of 36 vehicles in Sunrayce 97 and won the Award for Technical Innovation. Midnight Sun won the award because they were the first team to successfully implement sailed shaped front fairings used to catch crosswinds.

Midnight Sun V finished 10th overall in Sunrayce 1999 and was the first model to race in the 1999 World Solar Challenge, held in Australia. It came 25th overall in the World Solar Challenge and won the "Battler's Award" for "overcoming the most adversity to the finish line." The car's motor broke down with about 500 km to the finish line, but fortunately the team from MIT lent them a spare motor.

=== Midnight Sun VI to Midnight Sun X ===
Midnight Sun VI came 3rd at the American Solar Challenge and 15th in the World Solar Challenge. It was also one of the most reliable models.

Midnight Sun VII finished 3rd in the 2003 American Solar Challenge and earned the Award for Technical Innovation for the use of adaptable fairings, which enhanced sailing performance. The car later set a world record for its journey through the United States and Canada. The vehicle is currently on display for the public in the University of Waterloo's Engineering 5 building.

Midnight Sun VIII finished 5th overall in the 2005 American Solar Challenge and earned the Teamwork award.

Midnight Sun IX was unveiled on August 12, 2007, and painted black and gold in honour of the school's 50th anniversary. It is the first model to feature an upright seat, allowing for better visibility and a better fit for the five-point harness. It is about 1.8 m (5.9 ft) wide, 5 m (16 ft) long, and less than 1 m (3.3 ft) high—approximately the size of a Toyota Prius. It is capable of speeds up to 115 km/h from dawn until a few hours past dusk, and finished in 4th place overall in the 2008 North American Solar Challenge, a race in which only 15 of 25 cars made it to the final leg. Midnight Sun IX placed 16th overall in the 2007 World Solar Challenge and 2nd place in the "Challenge Production Class".

Midnight Sun X can reach a top speed of 130 km/h and has a cruising speed of 80 km/h. This model has SunPower A300 solar cells installed for the car's solar array. These cells are one of the world's most cost-effective solar cells on the market, giving the best dollar-to-watts ratio. Midnight Sun X finished 30th in the 2011 World Solar Challenge.

In February 2008, the team was featured on the Discovery Channel's Mean Green Machines.

The 8th generation of their solar car, MSVIII was on display at the Canadian Museum of Science and Technology located in Ottawa, and has since returned to the team's possession. The solar car placed 5th in the North American Solar Challenge in 2005. The title of top Canadian team was also given to the team for the North American Solar Challenge (NASC).

The 9th generation of their solar car, Midnight Sun IX (MSIX) was on display at the second annual solar and conservation fair in Toronto. In 2007, the MSIX placed 16th in 2007 for the World Solar Challenge. The solar car placed 4th in the North American Solar Challenge in 2008. The title of top Canadian team was also given to the team for the NASC.

The 10th generation of the car, Midnight Sun X (MSX) competed in the 2011 Veoila World Solar Challenge. It placed 30th in the competition.

=== Midnight Sun XI, XII and XIV ===
In 2016, Midnight Sun XI (the 11th generation) became the first cruiser class from University of Waterloo. It is marked as the switch from efficiency-based vehicle to consumer-focused cruiser class vehicles. Cruiser class vehicles have 4 wheels, one passenger along with the driver, and fully functional doors.

In 2018, the 12th generation of the car (MSXII), the second cruises classes from the University of Waterloo became the first Canadian cruiser-class vehicle to finish the American Solar Challenge and finishing at 3rd.

MSXIV is the most recent team's project. The team is planning to compete at 2021 American Solar Challenge with MSXIV in April 2021.

== Achievements ==
Year	Car	Race title	Place	Award
1997	IV	Sunrayce	7th	Top Canadian team; Won "Award for Technical Innovation"
1999	V	Sunrayce	10th	
1999	V	WSC	25th	Finished 5th for "Cut-out Class"; Won Battler's Award for persevering when the motor failed
2001	VI	ASC	3rd	Top Canadian team; "Sunrayce" became "American Solar Challenge"
2001	VI	WSC	15th	
2003	VII	ASC	3rd	Top Canadian team; Technical Innovation Award
2005	VIII	NASC	5th	Top Canadian team; "American Solar Challenge" became "North American Solar Challenge"
2007	IX	WSC	16th	Finished 2nd place in "Challenge Production Class"
2008	IX	NASC	4th	Top Canadian team
2011	X	WSC	30th	
2013	X	FSGP	7th	Top Canadian team
2018	XII	ASC	3rd	First Canadian Multi-Occupant Vehicle to ever complete ASC; Perseverance Award
