= Solar Resource =

The Solar Resource was an Australian entry in the inaugural World Solar Challenge race—then known as the Pentax World Solar Challenge race—in 1987.

The Solar Resource was one of 24 entries from 7 countries (Australia, Denmark, Japan, Pakistan, Switzerland, United States and West Germany) which raced from Darwin to Adelaide, a journey of just over 3000 km. The Solar Resource finished 7th overall, but came first in the ‘Private Entry’ category. Its overall average speed during the race 25.64 km/h. The race was won by the US-built GM entry, Sunraycer.

The Solar Resource was an Australian privately funded backyard project, headed by Ian Landon Smith, an engineer and alternative energy specialist during 1986-7. During that time, each component of the Solar Resource was made and re-made 3 times prior to a successful final construction. While the cost of building the car was approximately $75,000, almost $1 million on the 760 gallium-arsenide solar cells, usually used on space satellites.

The dimensions of the Solar Resource include a height of 1.04 metres, a width of 2 metres and a depth of 5.43 metres, with a total weight of 170 kg. It is powered by an electric motor that is Swiss-made, which has a variable drive, chain drive to its rear wheels. Built around a square tube frame, the body is set very low to the ground and is square in section, but with a rounded nose, which features four holes for ventilation. The cockpit cover is made of removable fibreglass, while the body panels are made of fibreglass, mylar and Kevlar. Attached to the roof, just above the tinted windscreen, is an externally mounted rear-view mirror which functions in the same manner as a ‘periscope’. The pneumatic tyres have four orange-coloured lights in each corner of the ‘hubcap’ which act as indicators. The axles are covered with white aerofoil and extend out from the body; the two front axles extend out further than the two rear ones.

The cockpit itself features polystyrene panels in the sides around the horizontally positioned aluminium tube frame seat. Two bottles are located behind the seat – one for drinking has a tube attached, and the other is for squirting and cooling purposes. Also behind the seat are two 12-volt Pulsar batteries. In front of the seat, the control panel contains digital readout instruments for the voltage and amp readings of both, the battery and the solar cells. Because of its racing context, a clock and stop watch are also part of the control panel. There is also a twenty-channel CB radio beneath the control panel. The steering wheel, shaped like a boomerang, is set in the centre.

Smith donated the Solar Resource to the Powerhouse Museum in 1990.
