= Hans Tholstrup =

Danish adventurer

Hans Jeppe Tholstrup AM (born 8 November 1944) is an Australian adventurer who was the first person to circumnavigate the Australian continent in an open power boat.

== Early life ==
The seeds of Tholstrup's adventurous streak were planted by meeting Thor Heyerdahl as a school boy in his native Denmark. He emigrated to Australia in 1964, settling initially in Darwin where he found employment as a buffalo hunter, schoolteacher, miner and stockman.

== Circumnavigation and other adventures ==
In 1970, Tholstrup became the first person to circumnavigate the Australian continent in an open power boat. His record, set between May and August 1970, starting and ending in Sydney, was all the more remarkable for having been achieved in an open 5.2 meters (17 feet) boat, a standard Caribbean Cougar runabout, which he named Tom Thumb. The boat, powered by a single 80 hp Mercury main outboard engine and with a fuel capacity over 100 gallons, was purchased with funds raised selling his sports car. He named it after the tiny boat sailed by Matthew Flinders and George Bass in their New South Wales coastal survey of 1796. In 1972, Tholstrup rode a Yamaha RT 360 two stroke motorcycle across Australia from Rockhampton to Perth with minimal supplies and support. This included the first unassisted solo crossing of the Simpson Desert via the French Line.

In 1975, Hans Tholstrup flew a Grumman Trainer aircraft solo around the world, making him the first Australian to have flown solo around the world in a fixed wing aircraft.

Twenty-nine years after setting his circumnavigation record, Tholstrup took to the sea again in another daring small powerboat voyage, this time from Darwin to Japan, in another 17-footer, a production Haines Signature 540 half-cabin fitted with a long-range tank and additional buoyancy.

== World Solar Challenge ==
Tholstrup devised the concept of the World Solar Challenge, after, in 1983, having made the first transcontinental journey in a solar-powered car, crossing Australia in "The Quiet Achiever". Tholstrup shared driving duties with Larry Perkins, who, with his brother Garry, had designed and built the vehicle.

== Awards and honours ==
Tholstrup was made a Member of the Order of Australia (AM) in the 2008 Australia Day Honours for "service to conservation and the environment through the development of renewable energy technology and the exploration of alternative fuel sources."

In 2014, he was awarded the "Lifetime of Adventure", the Australian Geographic Society's highest honour.
