= ANU Solar Racing =

Australian National University's solar car racing team

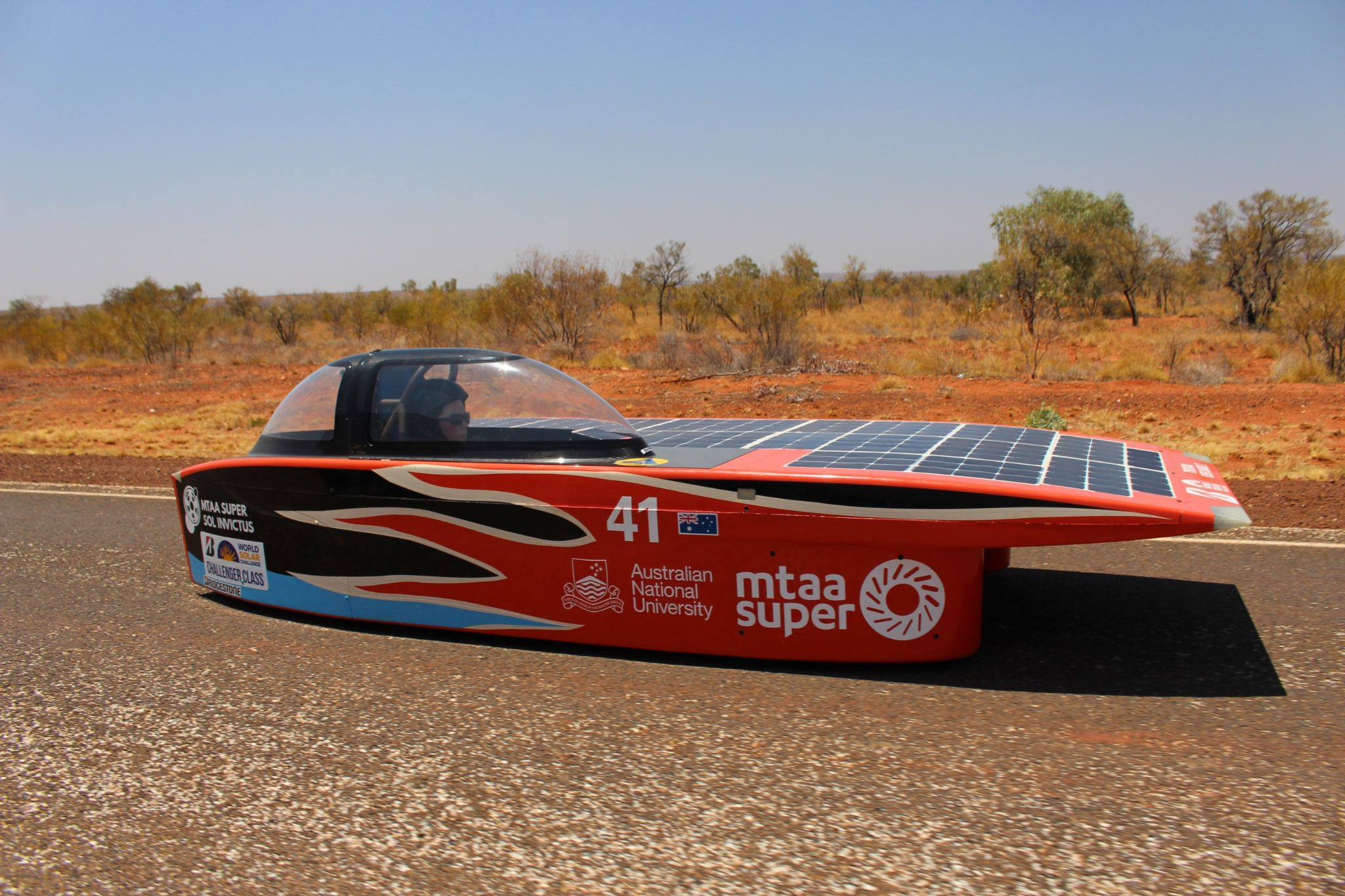
MTAA Super Solar Racing's Super Charge 2.0 racing in the 2019 WSC

ANU Solar Racing (formally known at MTAA Super Solar Racing or Sol Invictus) is the Australian National University's student-led solar car racing team. The team is built to innovate, bringing together a highly range of backgrounds ranging from engineering and science through to commerce and law. The team consists of all undergraduate students, and is split into an technical, business, and operations branches. The technical branch further divided into electrical, mechanical, aerodynamics, and software sub-teams. The team competes in the biennial World Solar Challenge from Darwin to Adelaide, covering 3,022 km of road. The target competition for ANU Solar Racing Team is the 2027 Bridgestone World Solar Challenge.

== Mission ==
The ANU Solar Racing team is focused on development and construction of a solar electric vehicle that can compete in the Bridgestone World Solar Challenge held in Australia between Darwin and Adelaide every two years.

According to the ANU Solar Racing team, the student-led organization mission is to enrich education, drive renewable energy innovation, uniting students to push the limits in automotive racing. The team also wants to construct a sustainable and rewarding student led program at the ANU which allows students to develop professional and practical skills that they are not able to develop in the classroom. The team is 100% student-run and has over 43 undergraduate members. The team's long-term goal is to win the Bridgestone World Solar Challenge by 2027.

== Solar Car 5 ==
A fifth car, Solar Car 5, was announced as in development for the 2027 Bridgestone World Solar Challenge.

== Solar Car 4/Monty ==
Monty, or SC4, is the fourth solar car from the ANU Solar Racing Team. It is a catamaran-style car featuring an asymmetric steering system and a tilted solar array designed to improve stability and crosswind performance. The car weighs 221 kg, has a top speed of approximately 122 km/h, and uses a 3 kWh battery. Monty competed in the 2025 Bridgestone World Solar Challenge Challenger Class, finishing 19th.

== Solar Spirit/SC3 ==
Solar Spirit, or SC3 is the third solar car from the ANU Solar Racing Team. Initially designed for the COVID-19 postponed 2021 BWSC, this car debuted at the 2023 Bridgestone World Solar Challenge. This car is a new take on the classic trimaran design with unique aerodynamic enhancements to increase performance, such as a decoupled fairing. The team takes pride in manufacturing many of this car's components in-house, such as solar cells which are soldered and encapsulated by the team.

== MTAA Super Charge 2.0 ==
The MTAA SuperCharge 2 is the second solar car from the ANU. Designed for the 2019 Bridgestone World Solar Challenge (BWSC). Building on the experiences and lessons from 2017, the team undertook a complete redesign and built a new car from the ground up. The team featured some familiar solar car faces as well as a host of new members to lean and bring their skillsets to the project. Over the last 2 years, behind the scenes; these students have worked tirelessly to produce this car and have also used the platform to promote renewable energies and STEM. The team proved the reliability of MTAA SuperCharge 2 throughout the 2019 BWSC with only minor issues during hundreds of kilometres of testing and the race; managing to drive 1500 km off the sun.

== MTAA Super Charge 1.0 ==
The ANU Solar Racing debut occurred at the 30th Anniversary of the Bridgestone World Solar Challenge in 2017. After qualifying to race in the Adventure Class, the MTAA Super Charge finished within the top 20 in a very competitive field; this first attempt offering both growth and experience for future races.

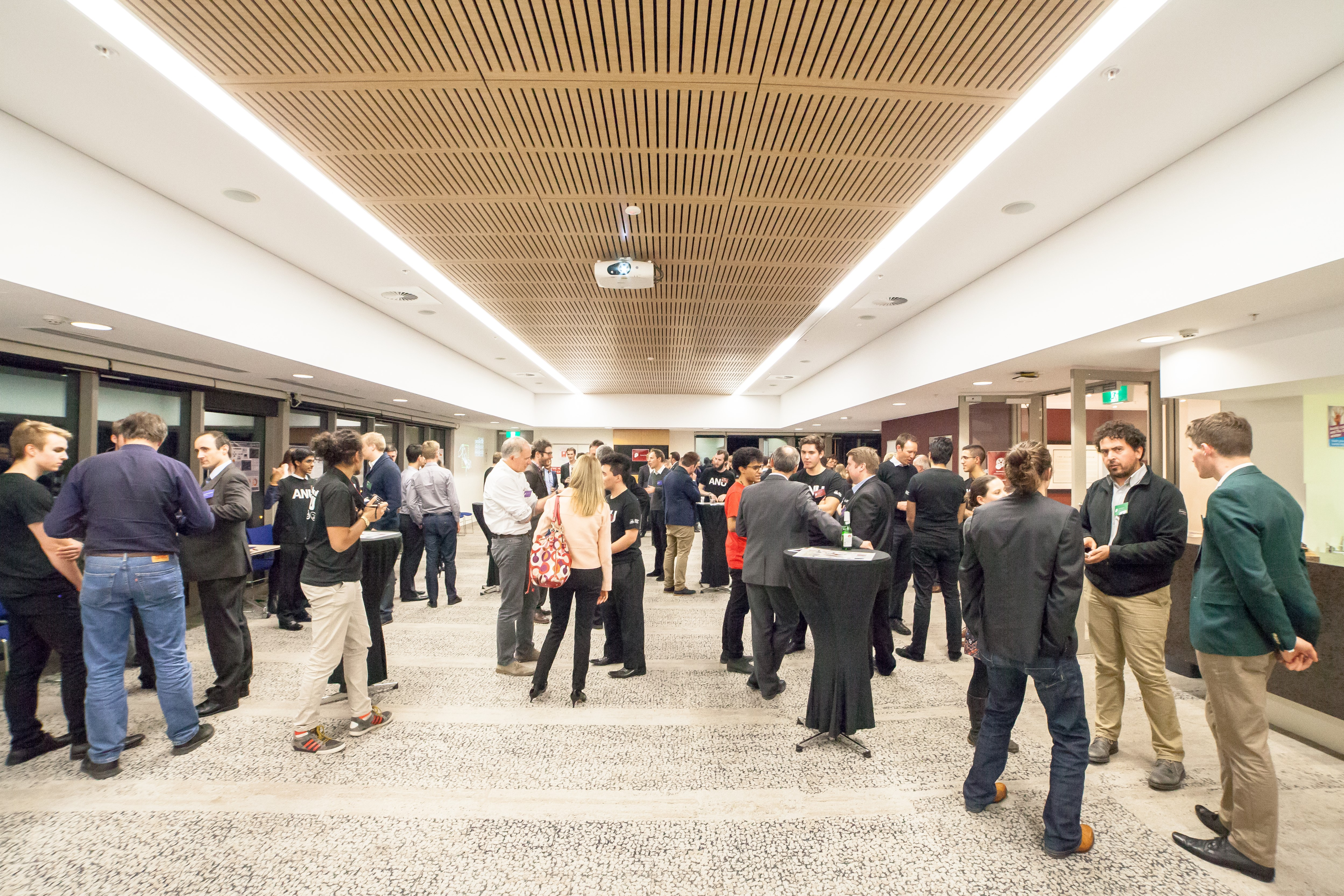
Sol Invictus' Inaugural Networking Night
