= The Quiet Achiever =

Australian solar powered vehicle

The Quiet Achiever solar car during its 1982-3 transcontinental journey.

The Quiet Achiever, also known as the Holden Solar Trek, was the world's first practical long-distance solar-powered car powered entirely by photovoltaic solar cells.

The project was promoted by adventurer Hans Tholstrup, with the Australian-made car developed by Larry Perkins and his brother Garry; and sponsored by BP. In December 1982, the car, driven by Hans Tholstrup and Larry Perkins, performed the first manned transcontinental journey using only solar power, traversing Australia from west to east.

== Description ==
The Quiet Achiever under construction.

The Quiet Achiever team working on the car's photovoltaic array.

The Quiet Achiever was hand-built by Larry and Garry Perkins. The body skin was made of fiberglass, while the skeleton framework was constructed of steel tubing, similar to what might be used in lightweight aircraft. The car had a large curved frontal window for the driver to see through, and side windows of clear fiberglass. The vehicle had a photovoltaic power system rated at 1 kilowatt, which powered it to an average speed of 14 miles per hour (23 km/h). The car's roof-mounted solar array consisted of two rows of ten 36-cell solar panels that were joined, giving a total roof area of around 91 square feet (8.5 m^{2}).

== History ==
=== Development ===
Hans Thostrup initially had the idea of auto racing using solar energy because he was interested in conserving non-renewable resources. He and Larry Perkins were inspired by the Sunmobile, a solar-powered miniature car built by General Motors which was publicly demonstrated in Chicago, United States, in 1955. BP sponsored the Quiet Achiever project, which was labelled the BP Solar Trek.

=== Trans-Australia journey ===
In December 1982 and January 1983, Tholstrup, along with Perkins, drove the car across Australia from Perth to the Sydney Opera House, travelling over 2,500 miles (4,000 kilometers) in under 20 days. By contrast, the first gasoline/petrol powered car took 30 days to do the same trip.

The Quiet Achiever's route was a 2,560-mile (4,130-km) west-to-east course which started on 19 December 1982 in Scarborough, a suburb of Perth, and finished in Sydney on 7 January 1983. The trek went through Southern Cross near Perth before passing through Coolgardie, Norseman, Cocklebiddy, Eucla, Ceduna, Port Augusta, Peterborough, Broken Hill, Wilcannia, Narromine, Dubbo, Orange, Bathurst and Katoomba, eventually ending at the Sydney Opera House. During the journey, thousands of spectators, including the indigenous people of the Nullarbor Plain, gathered to watch the Quiet Achiever pass by. In addition, the Confederation of Australian Motor Sport (CAMS) monitored the Quiet Achiever throughout its journey to ensure that only solar energy was used to power the vehicle. When the car arrived in Sydney, thousands gathered to watch it approach the Sydney Opera House. It completed a lap of the Mount Panorama Circuit in 18 minutes 45 seconds.

When the journey started at Scarborough Beach, a bottle of seawater from the Indian Ocean was obtained. This water was carried across Australia, before finally being ceremoniously poured into the Pacific Ocean at Sydney.

=== Influence after event ===
The success of the Quiet Achiever's trek led Tholstrup to found the annual World Solar Challenge, a solar-powered racing contest, in Australia in 1987. The World Solar Challenge is widely considered to be the world championship of solar car racing. The Quiet Achiever itself is now in the collection of the National Museum of Australia in Canberra.
