= World Solar Challenge =

Solar-powered car race event

Bridgestone World Solar Challenge

World Solar Challenge
- Venue: Stuart Highway
- Location: Australia
- Corporate sponsor: Bridgestone
- First race: 1987
- Distance: 3,022 km (1,878 mi)
- Duration: 4-7 days
- Most wins (team): Nuon (8) (Challenger); Eindhoven (Cruiser)

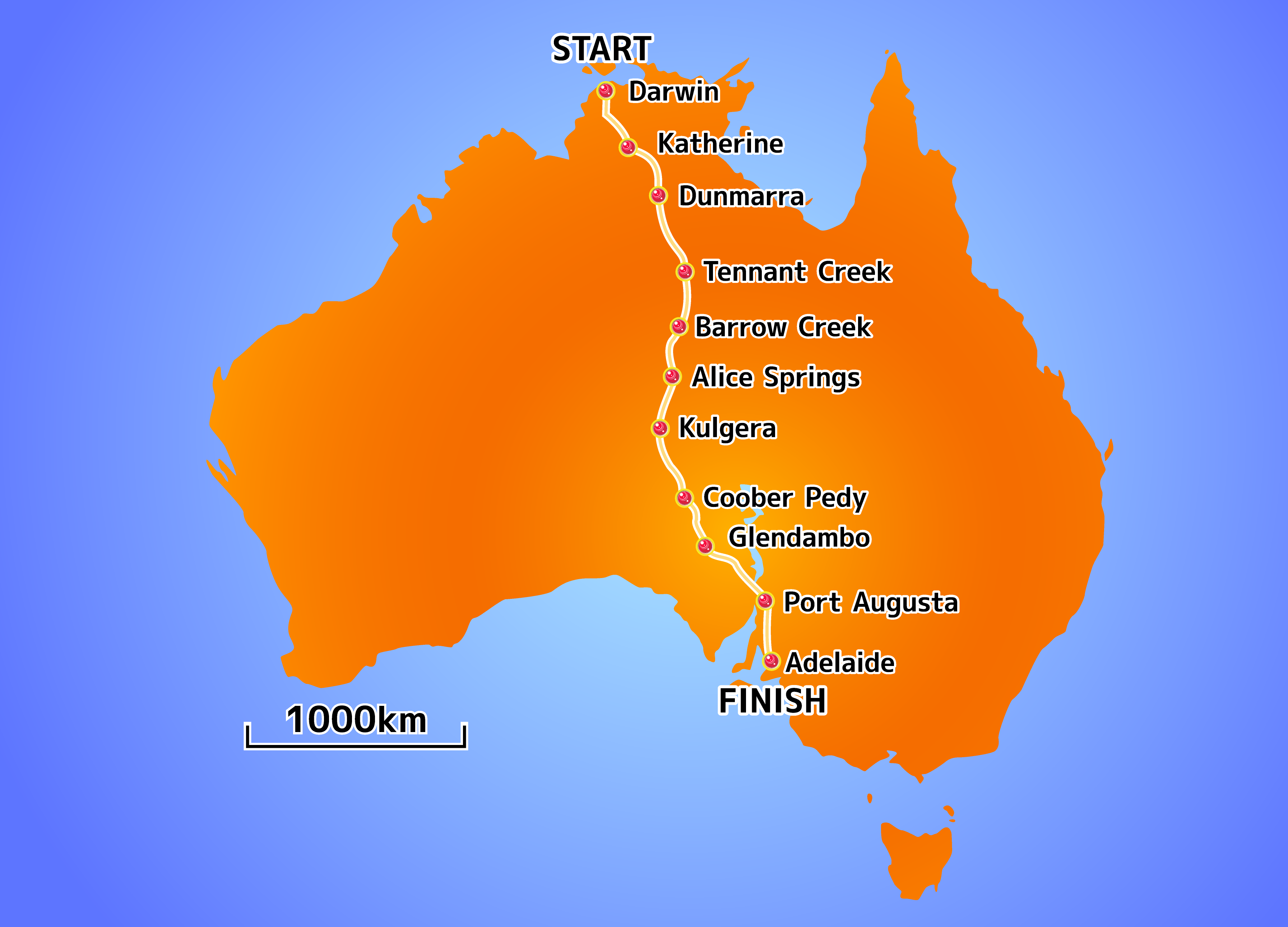
3,000km route of World Solar Challenge.

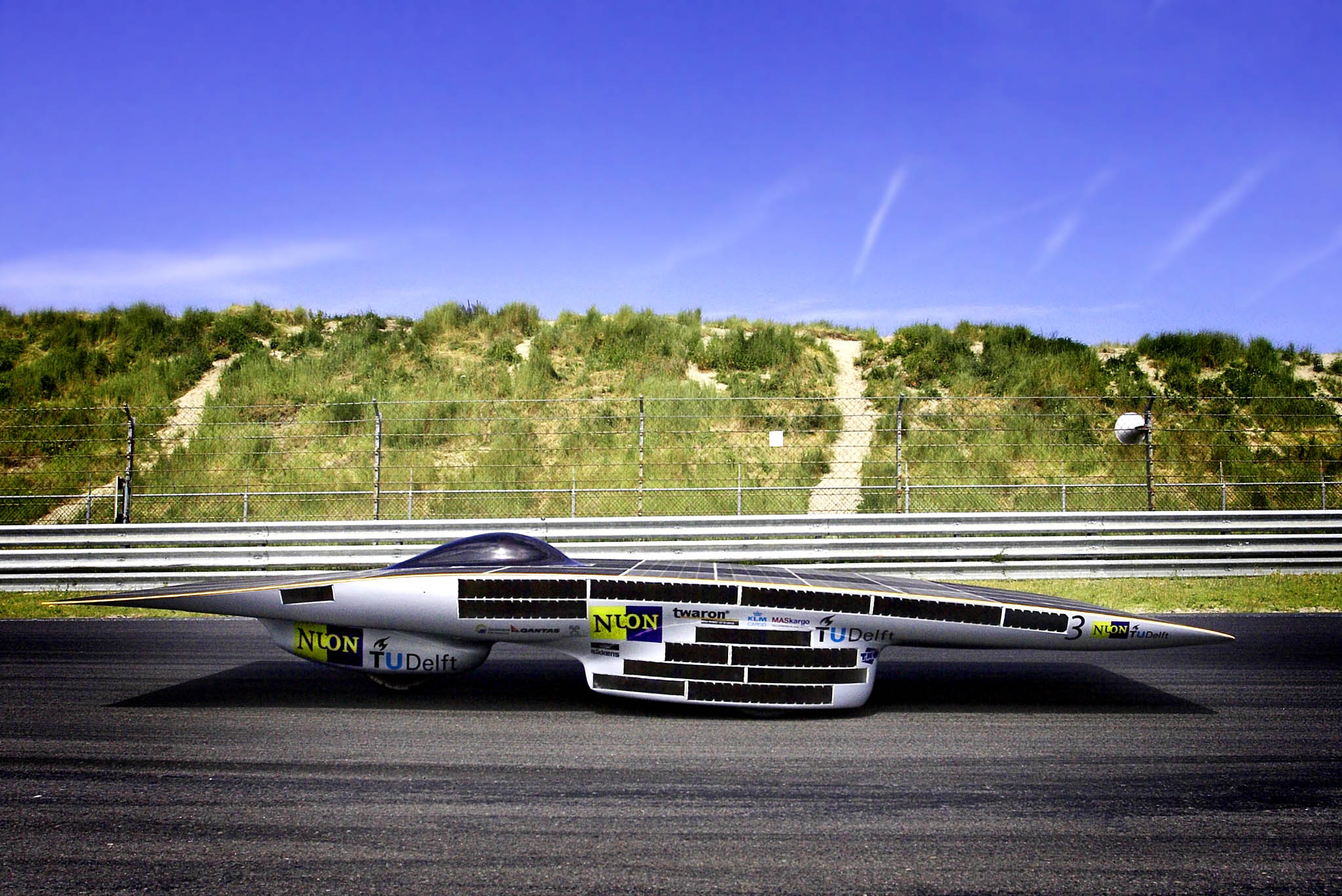
Nuna 3 of eight time victors Dutch team Nuna. Racing in 2001, it set the all-time record for the fastest completion of the race, finishing in just 29 hours and 11 minutes at an average speed of 103 km/h.

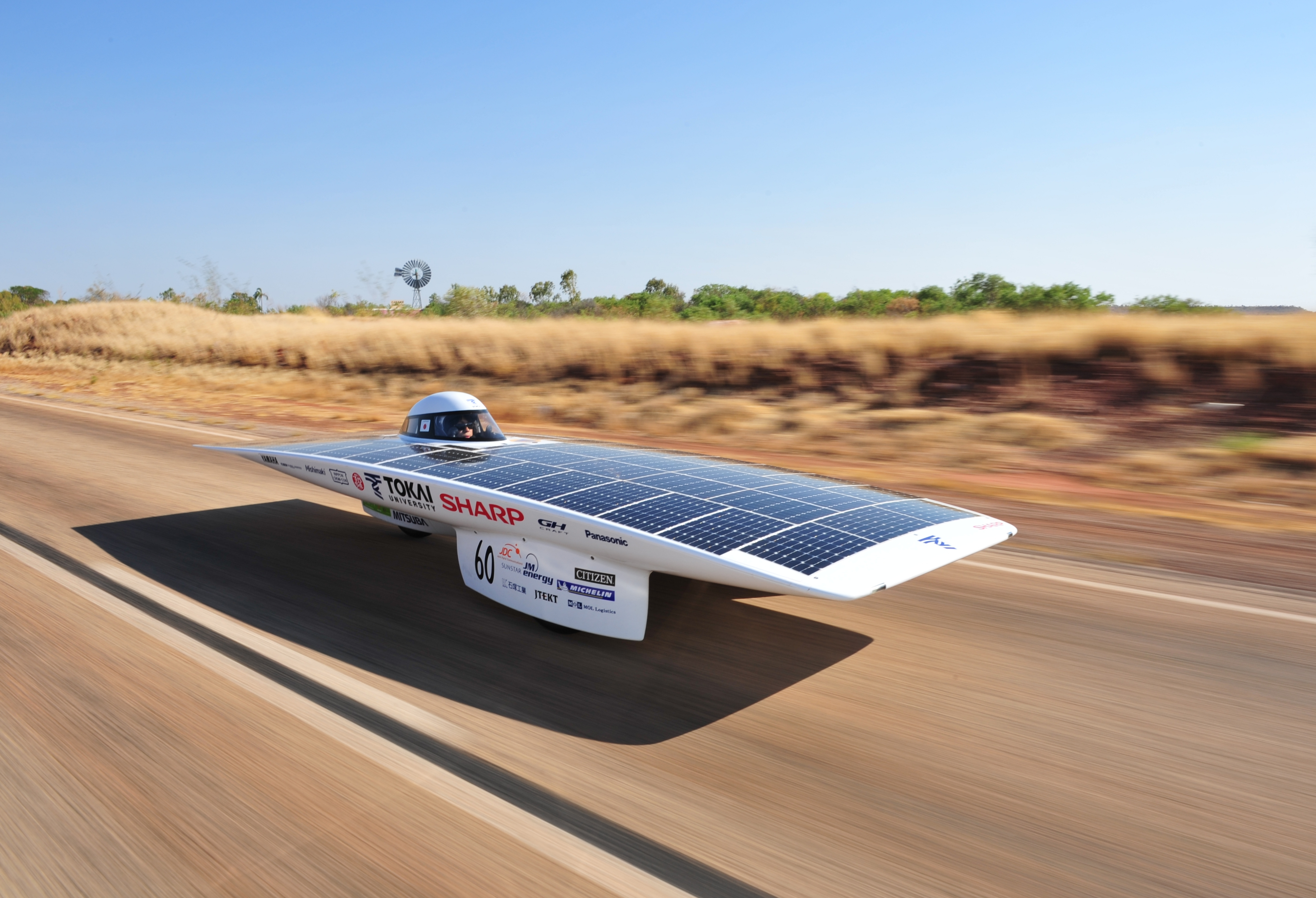
The winner of 2009 Global Green Challenge, "Tokai Challenger", Japan Tokai University Solar Car Team

The World Solar Challenge (WSC), named the Bridgestone World Solar Challenge since 2013, is an international event for solar powered cars. The course is over 3,022 Kilometers (1,878 miles) through the Australian outback, from Darwin in the Northern Territory to Adelaide in South Australia.The event was created in 1987 to encourage the development of solar-powered vehicles and has been held fifteen times over its 32-year history.

The World Solar Challenge is usually held every two years, but the 2021 event was canceled because of the COVID-19 pandemic, causing a four-year gap between the 2019 and 2023 events. The event was initially held once every three years, and became biennial from the turn of the century.

The WSC attracts teams from universities, corporations, and high schools around the world. Teams from Delft University of Technology (Netherlands), known as the Nuna team and cars, have won eight out of twelve races since 2001.

Since 2007, the WSC has included multiple vehicle classes. In 2013, a radically new "Cruiser Class" was introduced, promotes the technological development of practical, road-legal, and multi-seater solar vehicles. The speed of competing cars has increased from an average speed of 66.9 km/h (41.6 mph) in 1987 to 88.5 km/h (55.0 mph) in 1996, to 100 km/h (62 mph) by 2005.

== Objective ==
The objective of the challenge is to promote the innovation of solar-powered cars. It is a design competition at its core, and every team/car that successfully crosses the finish line is considered successful. Teams from universities and enterprises participate. In 2015, 43 teams from 23 countries competed in the challenge. Except Nuna team and cars from Delft University of Technology (Netherlands), team from Delft University of Technology (Netherlands), known as the Nuna team and cars, have won eight out of twelve races since 2001. The Tokai Challenger, built by the Tokai University of Japan, won in 2009 and 2011. The Belgian Innoptus Solar Team formerly known as the Agoria Solar Team from KU Leuven University won in 2019 and 2023.

Remarkable technological progress has been achieved since the General Motors led, highly experimental, single-seat Sunraycer prototype first won the WSC with an average speed of 66.9 km/h (41.6 mph). Once competing cars became steadily more capable to match or exceed legal maximum speeds on the Australian highway, the challenge rules were consistently made more demanding and challenging — for instance after Honda's Dream car first won with an average speed exceeding 88.5 km/h (55.0 mph) in 1996. In 2005 the Dutch Nuna team were the first to beat an average speed of 100 km/h (62 mph).

The 2017 Cruiser class winner, the five-seat Stella Vie vehicle, was able to carry an average of 3.4 occupants at an average speed of 69 km/h (43 mph). Like its two predecessors, the vehicle was successfully road registered by the Dutch team, further emphasizing the great progress in real-world compliance and practicality that has been achieved.

== Challenge strategy ==
Efficient balancing of power resources and power consumption is the key to success during the challenge. At any moment in time, the optimal driving speed depends on the weather forecast and the remaining capacity of the batteries. The team members in the escort cars will continuously remotely retrieve data from the solar car about its condition and use these data as input for prior developed computer programs to work out the best driving strategy.

It is equally important to charge the batteries as much as possible in periods of daylight when the car is not driving. To capture as much solar energy as possible, the solar panels are generally directed such that these are perpendicular to the incident sun rays. Sometimes the whole solar array is tilted for this purpose.

== Important rules ==
- The timed portion of the challenge stops at the outskirts of Adelaide, 2998 km from Darwin. However, for the timings recorded at that point to count, competitors must reach the official finish line in the centre of the city under solar power alone.
- As the challenge utilises public roads, the cars have to adhere to the normal traffic regulations.
- A minimum of 2 and maximum 4 drivers have to be registered. If the weight of a driver (including clothes) is less than 80 kg (180 lb), ballast will be added to make up the difference.
- Driving time is between 8:00 and 17:00 (from 8 a.m. to 5 p.m.). In order to select a suitable place for the overnight stop (alongside the highway) it is possible to extend the driving period for a maximum of 10 minutes, which extra driving time will be compensated by a starting time delay the next day.
- At various points along the route there are checkpoints where every car has to pause for 30 minutes. Only limited maintenance tasks (no repairs) are allowed during these compulsory stops.
- The capacity of the batteries is limited to a mass for each chemistry (such as Lithium Ion) equivalent to approximately 5 kWh maximum. At the start of the route, the batteries may be fully charged. Batteries may not be replaced during the competition, except in the situation of a breakdown. However, in that case, a penalty time will apply.
- Except for the maximum outer dimensions, there are no further restrictions on the design and construction of the car.
- The deceleration of the dual braking system must be at least 3.8 m/s^{2} (149.6 in/s^{2}).

=== Rule evolution ===
- By 2005, several teams were handicapped by the South Australian speed limit of 110 km/h (68 mph), as well as the difficulties of support crews keeping up with 130 km/h (81 mph) solar vehicles. It was generally agreed that the challenge of building a solar vehicle capable of crossing Australia at vehicular speeds had been met and exceeded. A new challenge was set: to build a new generation of solar car, which, with little modification, could be the basis for a practical proposition for sustainable transport.
- Entrants to the 2007 event chose between racing in the Adventure and Challenge classes. Challenge class cars were restricted to 6 square meters of Si solar collectors (a 25% reduction), and later to 3 square meters for GaAs, driver access and egress were required to be unaided, seating position upright, steering controlled with a steering wheel, and many new safety requirements were added. Competitors also had to adhere to the new 130 km/h (81 mph) speed limit across the Northern Territory portion of the Stuart Highway. The 2007 event again featured a range of supplementary classes, including the Greenfleet class, which features a range of non-solar energy-efficient vehicles exhibiting their fuel efficiency.
- For the 2009 challenge class several new rules were adopted, including the use of profiled tyres. Battery weight limits depend on secondary cell chemistries so that competitors have similar energy storage capabilities. Battery mass is now 20 kg for Li-ion and Li-polymer battery (was reduced from 25 and 21 kg in the past).
- In 2013, a new Cruiser Class was introduced. After the German team of Bochum University of Applied Sciences competed with a four-wheeled, multi-seat car, the BoCruiser (in 2009), in 2013 a radically new "Cruiser Class" was introduced, stimulating the technological development of practically usable, and ideally road-legal, multi-seater solar vehicles. The route took place in four stages. Final placings were based on a combination of time taken (56.6%), number of passengers carried (5.7%), battery energy from the grid between stages (18.9%), and a subjective assessment of practicality (18.9%). Since its inception, Solar Team Eindhoven's four- and five-seat Stella solar cars from Eindhoven University of Technology (Netherlands) won the Cruiser Class in all four events so far.
- In the 2015 Cruiser Class regulations, the scoring formula emphasized practicality less than before. Elapsed time will account for 70% of the score, passengers 5%, grid energy use 15%, and practicality 10%.
- In 2017, solar array areas were reduced, and the Cruiser Class was changed to a Regularity Trial, with scoring based on energy efficiency and practicality.
- In 2025, to slow down the race and show that solar cars are feasible even during winter, the race was shifted by two months to the end of August. To add more emphasis on the solar aspect of the challenge, the solar collector area was also increased to 6 m^{2} while limiting the battery pack capacity to 11 MJ.

== History ==
The idea for the competition originates from Danish-born adventurer Hans Tholstrup. He was the first to circumnavigate the Australian continent in a 16-foot (4.9 m) open boat. At a later stage in his life he became involved in various competitions with fuel-saving cars and trucks. Already in the 1980s, he became aware of the necessity to explore sustainable energy as a replacement for the limited available fossil fuel. Sponsored by BP, he designed the world's first solar car, called The Quiet Achiever, and traversed the 4,052 km (2,518 mi) between Sydney, New South Wales and Perth, Western Australia in 20 days. That was the precursor of the WSC.

After the 4th event, he sold the rights to the state of South Australia and leadership of the event was assumed by Chris Selwood.

The event was held every three years until 1999 when it was switched to every two years.

=== 1987 ===
The first edition of the World Solar Challenge was run in 1987 when the winning entry, GM's Sunraycer won with an average speed of 67 km/h (42 mph). Ford Australia's "Sunchaser" came in second. The "Solar Resource", which came in 7th overall, was first in the Private Entry category.

Results
| Position | Car No. | Team | Country | Car Name | Race Timer (HRS:MIN) | Avg. Speed (km/h) | Avg. Speed (mi/h) |
|---|---|---|---|---|---|---|---|
| 1 | 88 | General Motors | United States | Sunraycer | 44:90 | 66.90 | 41.57 |
| 2 | 7 | Australian Ford (Aurora) | Australia | Sunchaser | 67:53 | 44.48 | 27.64 |
| 3 | 17 | Ingenieurschule, Biel | Switzerland | Spirit of Biel | 69:97 | 42.94 | 26.68 |
| 4 | 1 | Australian Geographic | Australia | Marsupial | 81:43 | 36.89 | 22.92 |
| 5 | 15 | Charles Darwin University | Australia | Desert Rose | 95:45 | 31.47 | 19.55 |
| 6 | 12 | Chisholm Institute of Technology | Australia | Desert Cat | 98:20 | 30.59 | 19.01 |
| 7 | 11 | Solar Resource Syndicate | Australia | | | | |
| 8 | 19 | Massachusetts Institute of Technology | United States | Solectria 4 | | | |
| 9 | 14 | Alarus | Australia | Alarus | | | |
| 10 | 3 | Chariot of the Sun | Denmark | Chariot of the Sun | | | |
| 11 | 5 | Hoxan Corporation | Japan | Pheobus II | | | |
| 12 | 8 | Morphett Vale High School | Australia | Photon Flyer | | | |
| 13 | 4 | Semiconductor Energy Lab | Japan | Southern Cross | | | |

=== 1990 ===
The 1990 WSC was won by the "Spirit of Biel", built by Biel School of Engineering and Architecture in Switzerland followed by Honda in second place. Video coverage here.

Results
| Position | Team | Country | Race Timer (HRS) | Avg. speed (km/h) | Avg. speed (mi/h) |
|---|---|---|---|---|---|
| 1 | Ingenieurschule, Biel | Switzerland | 46.13 | 65 | 41 |
| 2 | Honda R&D | Japan | 55.00 | 55 | 34 |
| 3 | University of Michigan | United States | 57.25 | 53 | 33 |
| 4 | Hoxan | Japan | 57.35 | 53 | 33 |
| 5 | Western Washington University | United States | 58.20 | 54 | 32 |
| 6 | Australian Energy Research Laboratory | Australia | 59.90 | 50 | 31 |
| 7 | University of Maryland | United States | 60.71 | 50 | 31 |
| 8 | Crowder College | United States | 62.96 | 48 | 30 |
| 9 | Barossa | Australia | 63.29 | 48 | 30 |
| 10 | Cal State LA | United States | 67.76 | 44 | 28 |
| 11 | Cal Poly Pomona | United States | 68.03 | 44 | 28 |
| 12 | Northern Territory University | Australia | 69.61 | 43 | 27 |
| 13 | Monash University / Melbourne University | Australia | 69.81 | 43 | 27 |
| 14 | Kyocera | Japan | 71.38 | 42 | 26 |
| 15 | Star Micronics Pty Ltd. | Australia | 80.06 | 38 | 23 |
| 16 | Simon Co Ltd | Japan | 90.94 | 33 | 21 |
| 17 | Dimitri Lajovic | Australia | 94.71 | 32 | 20 |
| 18 | Konawaena High School | United States | 96.21 | 31 | 20 |
| 19 | Dripstone High School | Australia | 96.57 | 31 | 19 |
| 20 | Annesley College | Australia | 96.83 | 31 | 19 |
| 21 | Hirotaka Oyabu | Japan | 96.83 | 30 | 19 |
| 22 | Waseda University | Japan | 96.83 | 30 | 19 |
| 23 | Stewart Lister | New Zealand | 96.83 | 29 | 18 |
| 24 | Queens University | Canada | 96.83 | 26 | 16 |
| 25 | Aisin Seiki Co/AISOL | Japan | 96.83 | 25 | 16 |
| 26 | Yamawaki | Japan | 96.83 | 22 | 14 |
| 27 | Solar Research Association | | 96.83 | 21 | 13 |
| 28 | Semiconductor Energy Lab | Japan | 96.83 | 21 | 13 |
| 29 | Helio Det | Germany | 96.83 | 20 | 13 |
| 30 | Michiro Eguchi | Japan | 96.83 | 19 | 12 |
| 31 | Sonderborg Teknikum | Denmark | | | |
| 32 | Morphett Vale High School | Australia | retired | 16 | 10 |
| 33 | Phil Farrand | UK | retired | 12 | 8 |
| 34 | Nobuaki Hosokawa | Japan | retired | 3 | 2 |
| 35 | Mark Jensen | | retired | 13 | 8 |

=== 1993 ===
The 1993 WSC was won by the Honda Dream, and Biel School of Engineering and Architecture took second. Video coverage here.

Results
| Position | Team | Country | Race Timer (HRS:MIN) | Avg. speed (km/h) | Avg. speed (mi/h) |
|---|---|---|---|---|---|
| 1 | Honda R&D | Japan | 35:28 | 84.96 | 52.79 |
| 2 | Eng. Col. Biel | Switzerland | 38:30 | 78.27 | 48.64 |
| 3 | Kyocera | Japan | 42:35 | 70.76 | 43.97 |
| 4 | Waseda University | Japan | 42:50 | 70.35 | 43.71 |
| 5 | Aurora | Australia | 43:00 | 70.08 | 43.55 |
| 6 | Toyota | Japan | 46:34 | 64.71 | 40.21 |
| 7 | Northern Territory University | Australia | 46:50 | 64.34 | 39,98 |
| 8 | Cal Poly Pomona | United States | 47:21 | 63.64 | 39.54 |
| 9 | George Washington University | United States | 47:46 | 63.08 | 39.20 |
| 10 | Zero 2 Darwin | Australia | 48:38 | 61.96 | 38.50 |
| 11 | University of Michigan | United States | 49.07 | 61.35 | 38.12 |
| 12 | Nissan Motor Company | Japan | 50:21 | 59.85 | 37.19 |
| 13 | Cal State LA | United States | 50:37 | 59.53 | 36.99 |
| 14 | Stanford University | United States | 51:38 | 58.36 | 36.26 |
| 15 | Philips Solar Kiwi | New Zealand | 60:36 | 49.72 | 30.90 |
| 16 | Mabuchi Motor | Japan | 60:57 | 49.44 | 30.72 |
| 17 | Sofix | Japan | 64:56 | 46.41 | 28.84 |
| 18 | Tokai University | Japan | 74:22 | 40.52 | 25.18 |
| 19 | Monash University / Melbourne University | Australia | 74:50 | 40.27 | 25.02 |
| 20 | Laughing Sun | Japan | 75:48 | 39.75 | 24.70 |
| 21 | Mino Family | Japan | 76:21 | 39.47 | 24.53 |
| 22 | University of Oklahoma | United States | 79:37 | 37.85 | 23.52 |
| 23 | Sonderborg Tekikum | Denmark | 79:43 | 37.80 | 23.49 |
| 24 | Ashiya University | Japan | 79:48 | 37.76 | 23.46 |
| 25 | Dripstone High School | Australia | 81:17 | 37.76 | 23.03 |
| 26 | Panda-san | Japan | 84:15 | 35.77 | 22.23 |
| 27 | Solar Flair | UK | 84:57 | 35.47 | 22.04 |
| 28 | KIA Motors | South Korea | 85:27 | 35.26 | 21.91 |
| 29 | Team Alarus | Australia | 86:42 | 34.76 | 21.50 |
| 30 | Annesley College | Australia | 87:35 | 34.48 | 21.38 |
| 31 | Hokuriku Electric | Japan | 89:47 | 33.56 | 20.85 |
| 32 | Hokkaido Auto | Japan | 87:30 | 32.08 | 19.93 |
| 33 | Team Doraemon | Japan | 79:50 | 34.77 | 21.61 |
| 34 | Solar Japan | Japan | 80:10 | 31.73 | 19.72 |
| 35 | Mitcham Girls High School | Australia | 80:10 | 27.39 | 17.02 |
| 36 | Morphett Vale High School | Australia | 67:13 | 31.33 | 19.47 |
| 37 | University of Puerto Rico | United States | 62:36 | 30.08 | 18.69 |
| 38 | Team New England | United States | 53:02 | 28.13 | 17.48 |
| 39 | Le Soleil | Japan | 56:34 | 26.38 | 16.39 |
| 40 | University of Western Ontario | Canada | 63:51 | 23.37 | 14.52 |
| 41 | Team TR50 | UK | 71:20 | 20.92 | 13.00 |
| 42 | San Diego State University, Suntrakker | United States | 52:10 | 20.55 | 12.77 |
| 43 | Northern Territory Institute of T.A.F.E. | Australia | 37.34 | 26.22 | 16.29 |
| 44 | Meadowbank T.A.F.E. | Australia | 26:17 | 24.05 | 14.94 |
| 45 | Villanova University | United States | 20:50 | 15.07 | 9.36 |
| 46 | JCJS Solar Car | Japan | 21:55 | 14.33 | 8.90 |
| 47 | Banana Enterprise | Brazil | 16:40 | 15.12 | 9.40 |
| 48 | Hama Yumeka | Japan | 15:25 | 15.03 | 9.34 |
| 49 | Team Heliox | Switzerland | 08:23 | 24.69 | 15.34 |
| 50 | Team Moscow | Russia | 03:35 | 9.77 | 6.07 |
Pink background indicated teams that retired before completing the Darwin to Adelaide route

=== 1996 ===
In the 1996 WSC, the Honda Dream and Biel School of Engineering and Architecture once again placed first and second overall, respectively.

Results
| Place | Car no. | Team name | Country | Time and day of finish | Time (hr:mm) | Average speed (km/h) | Total distance |
|---|---|---|---|---|---|---|---|
| 1 | 1 | Honda R&D | Japan | Finished @ 17:26 / 30th | 33:32 | 89.76 | 3010 |
| 2 | 2 | United High Schools of Biel | Switzerland | Finished @ 10:10 / 31st | 35:00 | 86.00 | 3010 |
| 3 | 3 | Aisin Seiki Co Ltd | Japan | Finished @ 12:26 / 31st | 37:18 | 80.70 | 3010 |
| 4 | 33 | Mitsubishi | Japan | Finished @ 11:17 / 1st | 45:07 | 66.72 | 3010 |
| 5 | 52 | University of Queensland | Australia | Finished @ 12:34 / 1st | 46:24 | 64.87 | 3010 |
| 6 | 23 | Waseda University | Japan | Finished @ 12:48 / 1st | 46:38 | 64.55 | 3010 |
| 7 | 15 | Northern Territory University | Australia | Finished @ 14:12 / 1st | 48:02 | 62.66 | 3010 |
| 8 | 24 | O.S.U. | Japan | Finished @ 16:02 / 1st | 49:52 | 60.36 | 3010 |
| 9 | 99 | University of New South Wales | Australia | Finished @ 13:42 / 2nd | 56:32 | 53.24 | 3010 |
| 10 | 60 | Tokyo Salesian Polytechnic | Japan | Finished @ 09:36 / 3rd | 61.26 | 49.00 | 3010 |
| 11 | 100 | Queens University | Canada | Finished @ 09:39 / 3rd | 61.29 | 48.96 | 3010 |
| 12 | 96 | University of Western Ontario | Canada | Finished @ 12:09 / 3rd | 63.59 | 47.04 | 3010 |
| 13 | 10 | Tokai HS | Japan | Finished @ 13:45 / 3rd | 65.35 | 45.90 | 3010 |
| 14 | 20 | Mino Family | Japan | Finished @ 15:07 / 3rd | 66.57 | 44.96 | 3010 |
| 15 | 17 | Tokai University | Japan | Finished @ 15:20 / 3rd | 67.10 | 44.81 | 3010 |
| 16 | 5 | Lake Tuggeranong College | Australia | Finished @ 15:25 / 3rd | 67.15 | 44.76 | 3010 |
| 17 | 88 | Crested Ibis | Japan | Finished @ 16:01 / 3rd | 67.51 | 44.36 | 3010 |
| 18 | 53 | SunBa | Brazil | Finished @ 16:01 / 3rd | 68.43 | 43.80 | 3010 |
| 19 | 777 | Team Kataro | Japan | Finished @ 17:46 / 3rd | 70.12 | 42.88 | 3010 |
| 20 | 8 | Helios | France | Finished @ 09:59 / 4th | 70.49 | 42.50 | 3010 |
| 21 | 400 | France for W.S.C. | France | Finished @ 10:41 / 4th | 71.31 | 42.90 | 3010 |
| 22 | 6 | Hokkaido Automo. Eng. College | Japan | Finished @ 11:32 / 4th | 72.22 | 41.59 | 3010 |
| 23 | 2001 | Kirenjaku | Japan | Finished @ 12:27 / 4th | 73.17 | 41.07 | 3010 |
| 24 | 45 | Nippon Electronics College | Japan | Finished @ 12:44 / 4th | 73.34 | 40.91 | 3010 |
| 25 | 16 | UC Berkeley / Stanford University | United States | Finished @ 13:27 / 4th | 74.17 | 40.52 | 3010 |
| 26 | 32 | Soenderborg Teknikum | Denmark | Finished @ 13:31 / 4th | 74.21 | 40.48 | 3010 |
| 27 | 66 | Northern Sun | Canada | Finished @ 13:35 / 4th | 74.25 | 40.45 | 3010 |
| 28 | 999 | Jona Sun | Japan | Finished @ 15:09 / 4th | 75.59 | 39.61 | 3010 |
| 29 | 49 | Yokohama National University | Japan | Finished @ 10:14 / 5th | 80:04 | 37.59 | 3010 |
| 30 | 69 | Pumpkinseed | Japan | Finished @ 12:54 / 5th | 82:44 | 36.38 | 3010 |
| 31 | 18 | Annesley College | Australia | Finished @ 14:01 / 5th | 83:51 | 35.90 | 3010 |
| 32 | 9 | South Bank University | UK | Finished @ 14:14 / 5th | 84:04 | 35.80 | 3010 |
| | 11 | Los Altos High School (Hacienda Heights, California) | United States | North of Adelaide | | | |
| | 19 | Akita | Japan | North of Adelaide | | | |
| | 29 | Mexico Team | Mexico | withdrawn | | | 1927.2 |
| | 21 | Detlef Schmitz | Germany | withdrawn | | | 1690 |

=== 1999 ===
The 1999 WSC was finally won by a "home" team, the Australian Aurora team's Aurora 101 took the prize while Queen's University was the runner-up in the most closely contested WSC so far. The SunRayce class of American teams was won by Massachusetts Institute of Technology.

Results
| Place | Car no. | Team | Car name | Class | Country | Date in | Time in | Distance (km) | Total Time (HH:MM) | Avg Speed (km/h) |
|---|---|---|---|---|---|---|---|---|---|---|
| 1 | 101 | Aurora | Aurora | Silicon/Exotic | Australia | Oct 21 | 16:36 | 2998.7 | 41:06 | 72.96 |
| 2 | 100 | Queens University | Radiance | Silicon/Exotic | Canada | Oct 21 | 17:03 | 2998.7 | 41:33 | 72.12 |
| 3 | 52 | University of Queensland | Sunshark | Silicon/Exotic | Australia | Oct 22 | 08:20 | 2998.7 | 41:50 | 71.86 |
| 4 | 15 | Northern Territory University | Desert Rose | Silicon/Exotic | Australia | Oct 22 | 08:44 | 2998.7 | 42:14 | 71.00 |
| 5 | 3 | Kanazawa Institute of Technology | KIT Golden Eagle | Silicon/Exotic | Japan | Oct 22 | 11:03 | 2998.7 | 44:33 | 67.31 |
| 6 | 8 | Tamagawa Solar Challengers | Tamagawa Super Genbow | Silicon/Exotic | Japan | Oct 22 | 11:56 | 2998.7 | 45:26 | 66.00 |
| 7 | 10 | Lake Tuggeranong College | Spirit of Canberra | Silicon/Exotic | Australia | Oct 22 | 12:01 | 2998.7 | 45:31 | 65.86 |
| 8 | 6 | Massachusetts Institute of Technology | Manta GTX | Cut-out Class | United States | Oct 22 | 12:04 | 2998.7 | 45:34 | 65.81 |
| 9 | 2 | University of Michigan | Maize Blaze | Silicon/Exotic | United States | Oct 22 | 14:04 | 2998.7 | 47:34 | 63.04 |
| 10 | 24 | Osaka Sangyo University | OSU Model S | Silicon/Exotic | Japan | Oct 22 | 14:51 | 2998.7 | 48:21 | 62.02 |
| 11 | 4 | Solar Motions | Cascade Cruiser | Private | United States | Oct 22 | 14:51 | 2998.7 | 48:21 | 62.02 |
| 12 | 59 | Helios | Helios 2 | Silicon/Exotic | France | Oct 22 | 17:32 | 2998.7 | 51:24 | 58.34 |
| 13 | 1 | Tokai Shoyo High School | Shoyo Falcon | Secondary School | Japan | Oct 23 | 9:50 | 2998.7 | 52:20 | 57.30 |
| 14 | 26 | SA Solar Car Consortium | Ned | Silicon | Australia | Oct 23 | 12:43 | 2998.7 | 55:13 | 54.31 |
| 15 | 999 | Jona Sun | Jona Sun | Private | Japan | Oct 23 | 13:15 | 2998.7 | 55:45 | 53.79 |
| 16 | 65 | Tokyo Salesian Polytechnic | Ikuei Neo II | Silicon | Japan | Oct 23 | 14:21 | 2998.8 | 56:51 | 52.75 |
| 17 | 16 | Junkyard | Junkyard | Private | Japan | Oct 23 | 14:24 | 2998.7 | 56:54 | 52.70 |
| 18 | 50 | University of New South Wales | Sunswift II | Silicon/Exotic | Australia | Oct 23 | 14:44 | 2998.7 | 57:14 | 52.39 |
| 19 | 5 | Aoyama Gakuin | AGU Aglaia | Cut-out Class | Japan | Oct 23 | 15:51 | 2998.7 | 58:21 | 51.39 |
| 20 | 41 | Southbank University of ESC | Mad Dog | Silicon/Exotic | UK | Oct 23 | 16:41 | 2998.7 | 59:11 | 50.67 |
| 21 | 23 | Central Queensland University | Capricorn Solar Flair | Silicon | Australia | Oct 24 | 8:57 | 2998.7 | 60:27 | 49.61 |
| 22 | 142 | University of Missouri-Rolla | Solar Miner II | Cut-out Class | United States | Oct 24 | 11:55 | 2998.7 | 63:27 | 47.26 |
| 23 | 35 | University of Minnesota | Aurora II | Cut-out Class | United States | Oct 24 | 12:01 | 2998.7 | 63:31 | 47.21 |
| 24 | 63 | Futura | Futura 2 | Private | Italy | Oct 24 | 13:42 | 2998.7 | 65:12 | 45.99 |
| 25 | 124 | University of Waterloo | Midnight Sun V | Cut-out Class | Canada | Oct 25 | 14:45 | 2998.7 | 75:15 | 39.85 |
| 26 | 2001 | Kirenjaku | Kirenjaku IV | Private | Japan | Oct 26 | 12:00 | 2998.7 | 81:30 | 36.79 |
| 27 | 634 | Kashiwa kai-Musashi Tech | Musashi | Cut-out Class | Japan | Oct 26 | 13:38 | 2998.7 | 83:08 | 36.07 |
| 28 | 22 | Shiga SPD Polytech College | Polytech Spirit | Silicon/Exotic | Japan | Oct 26 | 14:09 | 2998.7 | 83:39 | 35.85 |
| 29 | 13 | Kormilda College | Towards Tomorrow | Secondary School | Australia | Oct 26 | | 2998.7 | withdrawn due to time penalties | |
| 30 | 18 | Annesley College | EOS | Secondary School | Australia | Oct 24 | | 1842.0 | withdrawn | |
| 31 | 27 | Detlef Schmitz | Helio Det 4 | Private | Germany | Oct 23 | | 1591.0 | withdrawn | |
| 32 | 34 | Club Solar Car Denmark | Solar Car Denmark 3 | Secondary School | Denmark | Oct 23 | | 1489.0 | withdrawn | |
| 33 | 28 | Sunspeed Singapore Polytech | Sunspeed 1 | Silicon | Singapore | Oct 21 | | 987.0 | withdrawn | |
| 34 | 12 | Dripstone High School | Aquila | Secondary School | Australia | Oct 20 | | 830.0 | withdrawn | |
| 35 | 42 | Southern Cross College | | Secondary School | Australia | Oct 20 | | 830.0 | withdrawn | |
| 36 | 58 | Newburgh Sol Machine | NFA | Secondary School | United States | Oct 19 | | 522.0 | withdrawn | |
| 37 | 1999 | Winston High School | Acclivus | Secondary School | United States | Oct 19 | | 475.0 | withdrawn | |
| 38 | 33 | Tsuroka National College of Technology | Green Leaf IV | Silicon | Japan | 19/10 | | 421.0 | withdrawn | |
| 39 | 9 | Solar Stealth | Solar Stealth | Secondary School | United States | Oct 19 | | 387.0 | withdrawn | |
| 40 | 51 | Mannum High School | | Secondary School | Australia | Oct 17 | | 70.0 | withdrawn | |

=== 2001 ===
The 2001 WSC was won by Nuna of the Delft University of Technology from the Netherlands, participating for the first time. Aurora took second place.

Results
| Rank | Car No | Team | Car Name | Class | Country | Date In | Time In | Distance (km) | Total Time (HH:MM) | Avg Speed (km/h) |
|---|---|---|---|---|---|---|---|---|---|---|
| 1 | 3 | Nuna | Nuna | Development | Netherlands | Nov 21 | 17:09 | 2997.8 | 32:39 | 91.81 |
| 2 | 101 | Aurora Vehicle Association | Aurora | Development | Australia | Nov 22 | 08:43 | 2997.8 | 33:13 | 90.26 |
| 3 | 2 | University of Michigan | M-Pulse | Development | United States | Nov 22 | 09:49 | 2997.8 | 34:19 | 87.37 |
| 4 | 142 | University of Missouri-Rolla | SolarMiner III | Development | United States | Nov 22 | 13:14 | 2997.8 | 37:44 | 79.45 |
| 5 | 100 | Queens University | Mirage | Production | Canada | Nov 22 | 13:43 | 2997.8 | 38:13 | 78.45 |
| 6 | 77 | University of Tamagawa (Team A) | White Dolphin | Production | Japan | Nov 22 | 14:53 | 2997.8 | 39:23 | 76.12 |
| 7 | 10 | Lake Tuggeranong College | Spirit of Canberra | Production | Australia | Nov 22 | 16:07 | 2997.8 | 40:37 | 73.81 |
| 8 | 15 | Northern Territory University | Desert Rose | Development | Australia | Nov 22 | 16:22 | 2997.8 | 40:52 | 73.36 |
| 9 | 33 | Kanazawa Institute of Technology | KIT Golden Eagle | Development | Japan | Nov 22 | 17:03 | 2997.8 | 41:33 | 72.14 |
| 10*** | 4 | Solar Motion | SoMo | Development | United States | Nov 23 | 09:07 | 2997.8 | 42:37 | 70.35 |
| 11 | 52 | University of New South Wales | Sunswift II | Development | Australia | Nov 23 | 10:01 | 2997.8 | 43:31 | 68.89 |
| 12 | 88 | University of Tamagawa(Team B) | Dolphin | Production | Japan | Nov 23 | 10:32 | 2997.8 | 44:02 | 68.08 |
| 13 | 11 | Tokai University | Tokai Spirit 2001 | Production | Japan | Nov 23 | 10:51 | 2997.8 | 44:21 | 67.59 |
| 14 | 12 | University of Toronto Blue Sky | Faust | Development | Canada | Nov 23 | 10:56 | 2997.8 | 44:26 | 67.47 |
| 15 | 24 | University of Waterloo | Midnight Sun VI | Development | Canada | Nov 23 | 10:57 | 2997.8 | 44:27 | 67.45 |
| 16 | 41 | South Bank University | Mad Dog 3 | Production | UK | Nov 23 | 13:28 | 2997.8 | 46:58 | 63.83 |
| 17 | 55 | Ashiya University | Sky-Ace Tiga | Production | Japan | Nov 23 | 14:49 | 2997.8 | 48:19 | 62.05 |
| 18 | 5 | AGU Solar Car Project | AGU Aglaia | Stock | Japan | Nov 23 | 14:52 | 2997.8 | 48:22 | 61.98 |
| 19 | 67 | Tokyo Salesian Polytechnic | Ikuei Neo II | Production | Japan | Nov 23 | 14:58 | 2997.8 | 48:28 | 61.86 |
| 20 | 59 | Helios | Helios 2-001 | Development | France | Nov 24 | 09:18 | 2997.8 | 51:48 | 61.26 |
| 21 | 26 | South Australia Solar Car Consortium | Ned | Stock | Australia | Nov 24 | 10:13 | 2997.8 | 52:23 | 57.23 |
| 22 | 17 | Solehada | Solelhada | Stock | France | Nov 24 | 10:43 | 2997.8 | 53:13 | 56.33 |
| 23 | 51 | Mannum Highschool | Christine | Production | Australia | Nov 26 | 16:17 | 2997.8 | 89:17 | 34.94 |
| 24 | 2001 | Team of Kirenjaku | Kirenjaku Mini | Production | Japan | Nov 27 | 13:27 | 2531.6 | | |
| 25 | 6 | Sungroper Solar Car Association | Sungroper | Stock | Australia | Nov 26 | 17:03 | 2301.5 | | |
| 26 | 13 | Kormilda College | Towards Tomorrow | Stock | Australia | Nov 26 | 11:34 | 2257.3 | | |
| 27 | 4740 | Team Ornithorhychus | Ornithorhychus | Stock | Australia | Nov 26 | 12:35 | 2063.8 | | |
| 28 | 50 | Burdekin Highschool | Spirit of Burdekin | Stock | Australia | Nov 26 | 12:48 | 2008.6 | | |
| 29 | 62 | South Australia Solar Car Consortium | Kelly | Production | Australia | Nov 23 | 15:31 | 1819.7 | | |
| 30 | 7 | Vehicle Solaire Neo-Caledonien | Defi Solaire | Production | New Caledonia | Nov 25 | 12:35 | 1531.0 | | |
| | 75 | Hutt Valley High School | Hutt Valley | Stock | New Zealand | Withdrawn | | | | |
| | 21 | HelioDet | Heliodet 5 | Stock | Germany | Withdrawn | | | | |
| | 42 | Southern Cross College | Southern Exposure | Stock | Australia | Withdrawn | | | | |
| | | Greenfleet | Honda Insight | Demonstration | Australia | | | 2997.8 | | |
| | 2500 | Biel | Spirit of Biel | Demonstration | Switzerland | | | 2997.9 | | |
| | 53 | Honda Australia | Insight | Demonstration | Australia | | | 2997.9 | | |
| | 18 | Annesley College | EOS Spirit of Unley | Demonstration | Australia | | | 2997.9 | | |
***Solar Motion was originally recorded arriving in 4th place at 12:07 on Nov 22, but was later penalized

=== 2003 ===
In the 2003 WSC Nuna 2, the successor to the winner of 2001 won again, with an average speed of 97 km/h (60 mph), while Aurora took second place again.

Results
| Rank | Car No. | Team | Car Name | Country | Date In | Time In | Distance (km) | Time (hr:mn) | Avg Speed (km/h) |
|---|---|---|---|---|---|---|---|---|---|
| 1 | 3 | Nuon | Nuna II | Netherlands | Oct 22 | 15:24 | 2997.8 | 30:54 | 97.02 |
| 2 | 101 | Aurora | Aurora | Australia | Oct 22 | 17:07 | 2997.8 | 32:37 | 91.90 |
| 3 | 9 | Massachusetts Institute of Technology | Tesseract | United States | Oct 23 | 08:22 | 2997.8 | 32:52 | 91.20 |
| 4 | 100 | Queens University | Gemini | Canada | Oct 23 | 13:46 | 2997.8 | 38:16 | 78.33 |
| 5 | 41 | Bochum | Hans Go | Germany | Oct 23 | 16:26 | 2997.8 | 40:56 | 73.24 |
| 6 | 32 | Principia College | Ra V | United States | Oct 23 | 16:50 | 2997.8 | 41:20 | 72.53 |
| 7 | 95 | Southern Taiwan University | Apollo IV | Taiwan | Oct 24 | 10:30 | 2997.8 | 44:00 | 68.13 |
| 8 | 62 | SA Consortium | Kelly | Australia | Oct 24 | 11:45 | 2997.8 | 45:15 | 66.25 |
| 9 | 5 | Aoyama Gakuin University | AGU Aglaia | Japan | Oct 24 | 15:56 | 2997.8 | 49:26 | 60.65 |
| 10 | 99 | Aurora/RMIT | Southern Aurora | Australia | Oct 25 | 10:06 | 2997.8 | 52:36 | 56.99 |
| 11 | 13 | Kormilda College | Towards Tomorrow | Australia | Oct 25 | 15:03 | 2997.8 | 57:33 | 52.09 |
| 12 | 4 | Universiti Teknologi Malaysia | Suria Kar 2 | Malaysia | Oct 26 | 09:39 | 2997.8 | 61:09 | 49.02 |
| 13 | 66 | National Taiwan University | Formosun II | Taiwan | Oct 26 | 09:51 | 2997.8 | 61:21 | 48.86 |
| 14 | 21 | HelioDet | Heliodet 6 | Germany | Oct 28 | 13:39 | 2997.8 | 82:49 | 36.20 |
| | 77 | Hachinohe Institute of Technology | Hi Tech | Japan | Oct 28 | | 2302.9 | | |
| | 8 | Houston Solar Race Team | Sundancer | United States | Oct 27 | | 2188.1 | | |
| | 59 | Helios III | Roadrunner | France | Oct 27 | | 2208.2 | | |
| | 6 | Leeming Senior High | Sungroper | Australia | Oct 27 | | 1565.6 | | |
| | 51 | Mannum High School | Christine | Australia | Oct 27 | | 1001.0 | | |
| | 42 | Southern Cross Catholic College | Southern Exposure | Australia | Oct 28 | | 1000.6 | | |
| | 2003 | Winston Solar Car Team | Astropower | United States | Oct 26 | | 720.2 | | |
| | 145 | Universidad del Turabo | The Paradise | Puerto Rico | Oct 26 | | 373.8 | | |

=== 2005 ===
In the 2005 WSC the top finishers were the same for the third consecutive event as Nuon's Nuna 3 won with a record average speed of 102.75 km/h (63.85 mph), and Aurora was the runner-up.

Results
| Rank | Car No. | Team | Car Name | Class | Country | Arrival Time | km | Speed (km/h) |
|---|---|---|---|---|---|---|---|---|
| 1 | 3 | Nuon | Nuna 3 | Open | Netherlands | 13:41 Wed 28th | 2998.3 | 102.75 |
| 2 | 101 | Aurora | Aurora | Open | Australia | 17:05 Wed 28th | 2998.3 | 92.03 |
| 3 | 2 | University of Michigan | Momentum | Open | United States | 08:48 Thurs 29th | 2998.3 | 90.03 |
| 4 | 81 | Ashiya University | Sky Ace TIGA | Open | Japan | 09:15 Thurs 29th | 2998.3 | |
| 5 | 66 | National Taiwan University | Formosun 3 | Open | Taiwan | 11:31 Thurs 29th | 2998.3 | |
| 6 | 6 | Massachusetts Institute of Technology | Tesseract | Open | United States | 15:30 Thurs 29th | 2998.3 | |
| 7 | 95 | Apollo | Apollo 5 | Open | Taiwan | 15:45 Thurs 29th | 2998.3 | |
| 8 | 41 | Bochum | Hans Go | Open | Germany | 16:35 Thurs 29th | 2998.3 | |
| 9 | 8 | University of Twente | Solutra | Open | Netherlands | 10:36 Fri 30th | 2998.3 | |
| 10 | 65 | University of Calgary | Soleon | Production | Canada | 13:45 Fri 30th | 2998.3 | |
| 11 | 7 | Umicore Solar Car | Umicore | Open | Belgium | 14:34 Fri 30th | 2998.3 | |
| 12 | 62 | TAFE SA | Kelly | Production | Australia | 15:43 Fri 30th | 2998.3 | |
| 13 | 5 | Aoyama Gakuin University | Aglaia | Production | Japan | 9:56 Sat 1st | 2998.3 | |
| 14 | 13 | Kormilda College | Towards Tomorrow | Stock | Australia | 13:24 Sat 1st | 2998.3 | |
| 15 | 168 | Southern Taiwan University | Phoenix | Open | Taiwan | 14:35 Sat 1st | 2998.3 | |
| 16 | 80 | Sunspeed | Jules Verne | Open | France | 10:52 Sun 2nd | 2726 | |
| 17 | 96 | University of Western Ontario | Sunstang | Open | Canada | 15:23 Sun 2nd | 1573 | |
| 18 | 20 | Leeming Senior High | Sungroper | Production | Australia | 19:06 Sat 1st | 591 | |
| *** | 49 | UNSW Sydney | Sunswift III | Open | Australia | 17:10 Thurs 29th | 2998.3 | |
| | 99 | Southern Aurora | Southern Aurora | Open | Australia | officially withdrawn Alice Springs 16:13 - 27th Sept | | |
| | 21 | Heliodet | Heliodet | Production | Germany | officially withdrawn Dunmarra 15:45 - 26th Sept | | |
*** Sunswift were unable to qualify, but were given permission to run with the event

=== 2007 ===
The 2007 WSC saw the Dutch Nuon Solar team score their fourth successive victory with Nuna 4 in the Challenge Class, averaging 90.07 km/h (55.97 mph) under the new, more restrictive rules, while the Belgian Punch Powertrain Solar Team's Umicar Infinity placed second.

The Adventure Class was added this year, run under the old rules, and won by Japanese Ashiya team's Tiga.

Challenge results
| Rank | Team | Country | Distance (km) | Time (hr:mn) | Speed (km/h) |
|---|---|---|---|---|---|
| 1 | Nuon | Netherlands | 2999 | 33:00 | 90.87 |
| 2 | Umicore | Belgium | 2999 | 34:36 | 88.05 |
| 3 | Aurora | Australia | 2999 | 35:17 | 85.00 |
| 4 | Bochum Solar World 1 | Germany | 2999 | 41:09 | 72.87 |
| 5 | Southern Taiwan University | Taiwan | 2999 | 44:08 | 67.95 |
| 6 | University of Twente | Netherlands | 2999 | 44:46 | 66.83 |
| 7 | University of Michigan | United States | 2999 | 44:55 | 66.76 |
| 8 | University of Calgary | Canada | 2999 | 51:43 | 57.98 |
| 9 | University of Waterloo | Canada | 2999 | 54:49 | 54.70 |
| 10 | Helios | France | 2999 | 59:24 | 50.80 |
| 11 | Solar Fox | UK | 2719 | | |
| 12 | Sinag | Philippines | 2691 | | |
| 13 | Sun Speed | France | 2002 | | |
| 14 | University of Chile | Chile | 1862 | | |
| 15 | Queens University | Canada | 1345 | | |
| 16 | Leeming HS | Australia | 1050 | | |
| 17 | Gwawr | UK | 740 | | |
| 18 | Heliox | Switzerland | 735 | | |
| 19 | University of Malaya | Malaysia | 250 | | |

The Japanese Ashiya team's Tiga won the Adventure Class, run under the old rules, with an average speed of 93.53 km/h (58.12 mph).

Adventure results
| Rank | Team | Country | Distance (km) | Time (hr:mn) | Speed (km/h) |
|---|---|---|---|---|---|
| 1 | Ashiya University | Japan | 2999 | 32:03 | 93.57 |
| 2 | Apollo | Taiwan | 2999 | 35:43 | 83.96 |
| 3 | Southern Aurora | Australia | 2999 | 40:44 | 73.63 |
| 4 | sUNSWift UNSW Sydney | Australia | 2999 | 44:11 | 67.88 |
| 5 | University of Toronto | Canada | 2999 | 46:19 | 64.74 |
| 6 | Christine Aurora | Australia | 2999 | 46:33 | 64.42 |
| 7 | TAFE SA | Australia | 2999 | 50:52 | 58.95 |
| 8 | Salesian Polytechnic University | Japan | 2999 | 58:19 | 51.42 |
| 9 | Towards Tomorrow | Australia | 2896 | | |
| 10 | University Tech Malaysia | Malaysia | 2719 | | |
| 11 | HelioDet | Germany | 2517 | | |
| 12 | Solar Fern | New Zealand | 2233 | | |
| 13 | Stanford University | United States | 1864 | | |
| 14 | University of Western Ontario | Canada | 1680 | | |
| 15 | Hachinohe Institute of Technology | Japan | 1675 | | |
| 16 | Polytechnique Montreal | Canada | 1772 | | |
| 17 | Willetton | Australia | 729 | | |
| 18 | Houston HS | United States | 143 | | |

=== 2009 ===
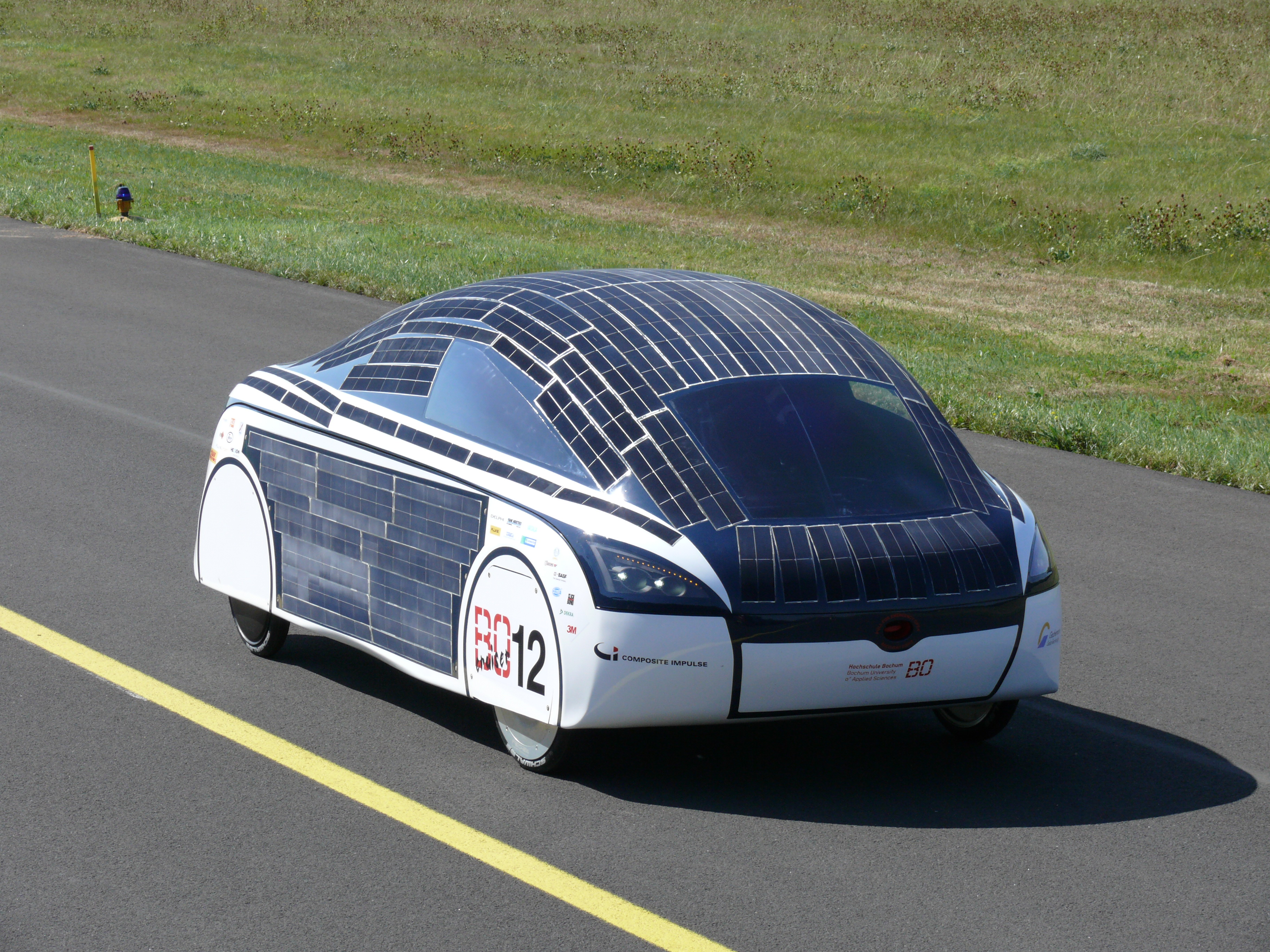
In 2009, the BO-Cruiser prototype from Bochum (Germany) stood out by a more practical, real world design, sporting 4 wheels and multiple seats

The 2009 WSC was won by the "Tokai Challenger", built by the Tokai University Solar Car Team in Japan with an average speed of 100.54 km/h (62.47 mph). The longtime reigning champion Nuon Solar Team's Nuna 5 finished in second place.

Challenger results
| Rank | Team | Country | Distance (km) | Time (hr:mn) | Speed (km/h) |
|---|---|---|---|---|---|
| 1 | Tokai University | Japan | 3021 | 29:49 | 100.54 |
| 2 | Nuon | Netherlands | 3021 | 32:38 | 91.88 |
| 3 | University of Michigan | United States | 3021 | 33:08 | 90.49 |
| 4 | University of New South Wales | Australia | 3021 | 39:18 | 76.28 |
| 5 | Massachusetts Institute of Technology | United States | 3021 | 40:41 | 73.70 |
| 6 | Aurora | Australia | 3021 | 42:20 | 70.82 |
| 7 | Principia College | United States | 3021 | 43:23 | 69.11 |
| 8 | University of Twente | Netherlands | 3021 | 44:53 | 66.80 |
| 9 | Bochum Solar World 1 | Germany | 2896 | | |
| 10 | Stanford University | United States | 2719 | | |
| 11 | Nanyang Technological University | Singapore | 1953 | | |
| 12 | Bochum Bo Cruiser | Germany | 1850 | | |
| 13 | Belenos | France | 1645 | | |
| 14 | University of Cambridge | UK | 1616 | | |
| 15 | Sakarya University | Turkey | 1437 | | |
| 16 | Istanbul Technical University | Turkey | 1380 | | |
| 17 | Heliox | Switzerland | 1042 | | |
| 18 | Leeming HS | Australia | 950 | | |
| 19 | Willetton HS | Australia | 906 | | |
| 20 | Umicore | Belgium | 380 | | |
| 21 | Polytechnique Montreal | Canada | 287 | | |
| 22 | Uniten Solar Ranger Team | Malaysia | 250 | | |
| 23 | McMaster University | Canada | 146 | | |
| 24 | ETS | Canada | 96 | | |

The Sunswift IV built by students at the University of New South Wales, Australia was the winner of the Silicon-based Solar Cell Class, while Japan's Osaka Sangyo University's OSU Model S won the Adventure class.

Adventure results
| Rank | Team | Country | Distance (km) | Time (hr:mn) | Speed (km/h) |
|---|---|---|---|---|---|
| 1 | OSU | Japan | 3021 | 34:45 | 86.27 |
| 2 | Southern Aurora | Australia | 3021 | 44:17 | 67.71 |
| 3 | Goko HS | Japan | 2719 | | 61.77 |
| 4 | Helios | France | 2719 | | 58.31 |
| 5 | SolarShop Kelly | Australia | 2217 | | |
| 6 | Towards Tomorrow | Australia | 1156 | | |
| 7 | CPDM | Malaysia | 514 | | |

=== 2011 ===
In the 2011 WSC Tokai University took their second title with an updated "Tokai Challenger" averaging 91.54 km/h (56.88 mph), and finishing just an hour before Nuna 6 of the Delft University of Technology. The challenge was marred by delays caused by wildfires.

Results
| Rank | Team | Country | Distance (km) | Time (hr:mn) | Speed (km/h) |
|---|---|---|---|---|---|
| 1 | Tokai University | Japan | 2998 | 32:45 | 91.54 |
| 2 | Nuon | Netherlands | 2998 | 33:50 | 88.60 |
| 3 | University of Michigan | United States | 2998 | 35:33 | 84.33 |
| 4 | Ashiya University | Japan | 2998 | 44:57 | 66.70 |
| 5 | University of Twente | Netherlands | 2998 | 44:04 | 66.53 |
| 6 | University of New South Wales | Australia | 2998 | 48:38 | 61.65 |
| 7 | Aurora | Australia | 2998 | 48:45 | 61.50 |
| 8 | Istanbul University | Turkey | 2765 | | |
| 9 | Apollo | Taiwan | 2650 | | |
| 10 | Umicore | Belgium | 2636 | | |
| 11 | Stanford University | United States | 2547 | | |
| 12 | Nanyang Technological University | Singapore | 2454 | | |
| 13 | Team Okinawa | Japan | 2408 | | |
| 14 | Sakarya University | Turkey | 2263 | | |
| 15 | Massachusetts Institute of Technology | United States | 2222 | | |
| 16 | Solar Energy Racers | Switzerland | 2221 | | |
| 17 | Qazvin Islamic Azad University | Iran | 1891 | | |
| 18 | University of Calgary | Canada | 1840 | | |
| 19 | Team Solar Philippines | Philippines | 1815 | | |
| 20 | UC Berkeley | United States | 1811 | | |
| 21 | Onda Solare | Italy | 1751 | | |
| 22 | Universidad de Chile | Chile | 1709 | | |
| 23 | Anadolu | Turkey | 1675 | | |
| 24 | University of Toronto | Canada | 1661 | | |
| 25 | University of Cambridge | UK | 1487 | | |
| 26 | Bochum | Germany | 1454 | | |
| 27 | ETS | Canada | 1415 | | |
| 28 | Principia College | United States | 1303 | | |
| 29 | Seraaj | Saudi Arabia | 1269 | | |
| 30 | University of Waterloo | Canada | 1116 | | |
| 31 | University of Tehran | Iran | 1027 | | |
| 32 | Solar Spirit Australia | Australia | 801 | | |
| 33 | Durham University | UK | 552 | | |
| 34 | Solaris | India | 301 | | |
| 35 | UMP | Malaysia | 229 | | |
| 36 | Uniten Solar Ranger Team | Malaysia | 223 | | |
| 37 | Green Maniac | South Korea | 73 | | |

=== 2013 ===
The 2013 WSC featured the introduction of the Cruiser Class, which comprised more 'practical' solar cars with 2–4 occupants. The inaugural winner was Solar Team Eindhoven's Stella from Eindhoven University of Technology in the Netherlands with an average speed of 74.52 km/h (46.30 mph), while second place was taken by the PowerCore SunCruiser vehicle from team Hochschule Bochum in Germany, who inspired the creation of the Cruiser Class by racing more practical solar cars in previous WSC events. The Australian team, the University of New South Wales solar racing team Sunswift was the fastest competitor to complete the route, but was awarded third place overall after points were awarded for 'practicality' and for carrying passengers.

Cruiser Results
| Rank | Team | Country | Distance (km) | Time (hr:mn) | Person kilometers | External energy (kWh) | Practicality (%) | Final score (%) |
|---|---|---|---|---|---|---|---|---|
| 1 | TU Eindhoven | Netherlands | 3022 | 40:14 | 9093 | 64.0 | 88.3 | 97.5 |
| 2 | HS Bochum | Germany | 3022 | 41:38 | 6484 | 63.5 | 87.0 | 93.9 |
| 3 | Sunswift | Australia | 3022 | 38:35 | 3022 | 64.0 | 70.7 | 92.3 |
| 4 | University of Minnesota | United States | 3022 | 51:41 | 5454 | 64.0 | 69.3 | 79.2 |
| 5 | Goko HS | Japan | 2288 | | | | 70.7 | |
| 6 | Apollo | Taiwan | 1558 | | | | 50.3 | |
| 7 | TAFE SA Solar Spirit | Australia | 1469 | | | | 71.7 | |
| 8 | University of Calgary | Canada | 719 | | | | 78.0 | |

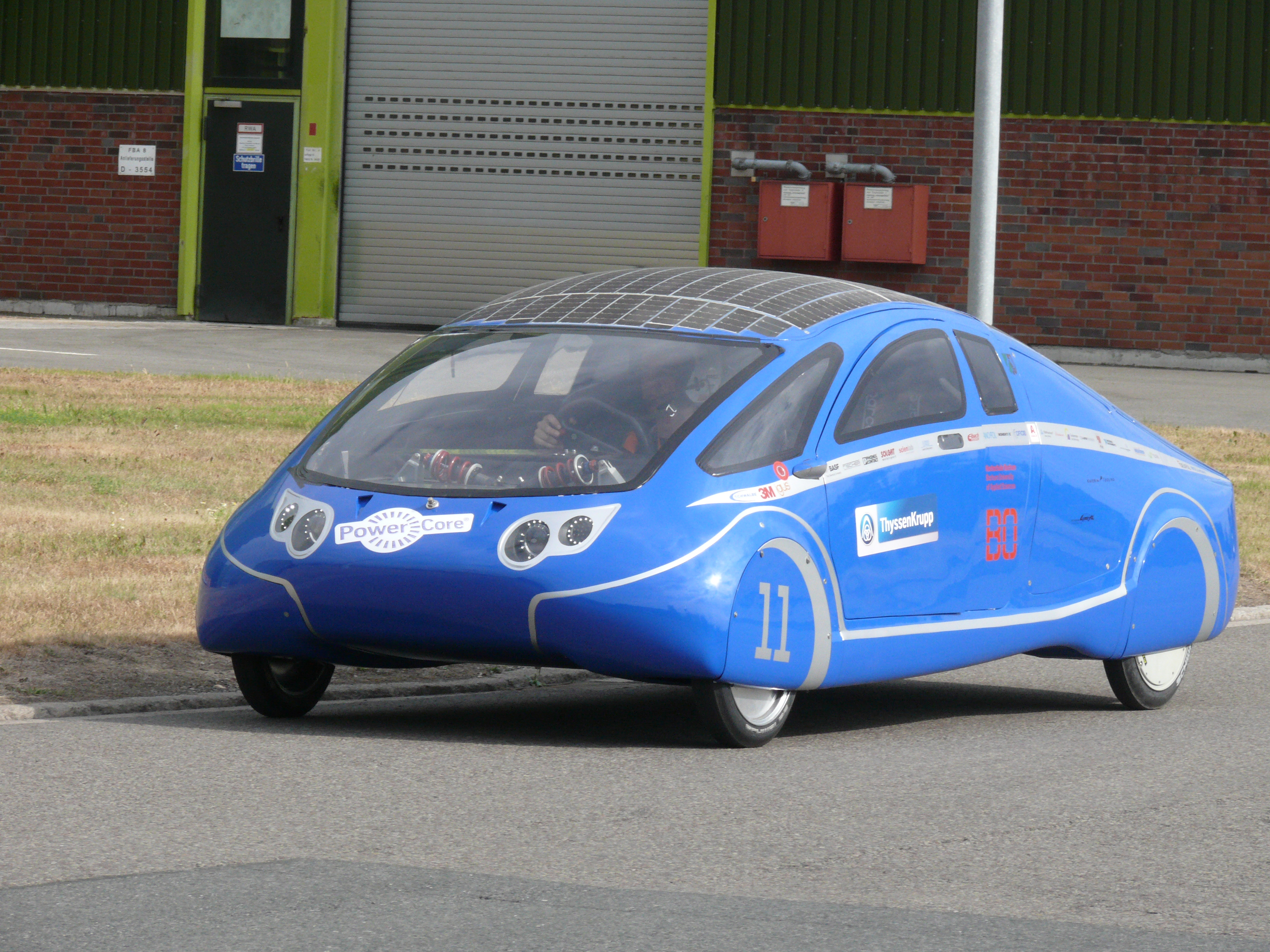
The 2013 German PowerCore SunCruiser entry for the new for 2013 Cruiser Class

In the Challenger Class, the Dutch team from Delft University of Technology took back the title with Nuna 7 and an average speed of 90.71 km/h (56.36 mph), while defending champions Tokai University finished second after an exciting close competition, which saw a 10–30 minute distance, though they drained the battery in final stint due to bad weather and finished some 3 hours later; an opposite situation of the previous challenge in 2011.

Challenger results
| Rank | Team | Country | Distance (km) | Time (hr:mn) | Speed (km/h) |
|---|---|---|---|---|---|
| 1 | Nuon | Netherlands | 3022 | 33:03 | 90.71 |
| 2 | Tokai University | Japan | 3022 | 36:22 | 82.43 |
| 3 | University of Twente | Netherlands | 3022 | 37:38 | 79.67 |
| 4 | Stanford University | United States | 3022 | 39:31 | 75.86 |
| 5 | Solar Energy Racers | Switzerland | 3022 | 40:13 | 74.54 |
| 6 | Punch Powertrain (KU Leuven) | Belgium | 3022 | 40:28 | 74.08 |
| 7 | Team Arrow | Australia | 3022 | 43:38 | 68.71 |
| 8 | University of Toronto | Canada | 3022 | 45:38 | 65.71 |
| 9 | University of Michigan | United States | 3022 | 45:55 | 65.29 |
| 10 | Onda Solare | Italy | 3022 | 48:25 | 61.92 |
| 11 | University of Western Sydney | Australia | 2891 | | |
| 12 | Kanazawa Institute of Technology | Japan | 2564 | | |
| 13 | EAFIT-EPM | Colombia | 2505 | | |
| 14 | Kogakuin University | Japan | 2450 | | |
| 15 | KUST | South Korea | 2013 | | |
| 16 | SunSPEC | Singapore | 1676 | | |
| 17 | Istanbul Technical University | Turkey | 1613 | | |
| 18 | ETS | Canada | 1530 | | |
| 19 | Sun Shuttle | China | 1398 | | |
| 20 | Jonkoping University | Sweden | 1301 | | |
| 21 | ITS | Indonesia | 748 | | |
| 22 | UMP | Malaysia | 616 | | |

The Adventure Class was won by Aurora's Aurora Evolution.

Adventure results
| Rank | Team | Country | Distance (km) | Time (hr:mn) | Speed (km/h) |
|---|---|---|---|---|---|
| 1 | Aurora | Australia | 3022 | 38:39 | 77.57 |
| 2 | Antakari | Chile | 3022 | 49:31 | 60.54 |
| 3 | Sikat Solar | Philippines | 2487 | | |
| 4 | IVE | Hong Kong | 2105 | | |
| 5 | KAIT | Japan | 1533 | | |
| 6 | Solaris | Turkey | 1481 | | |
| 7 | Mississippi Choctaw HS | United States | 164 | | |

=== 2015 ===
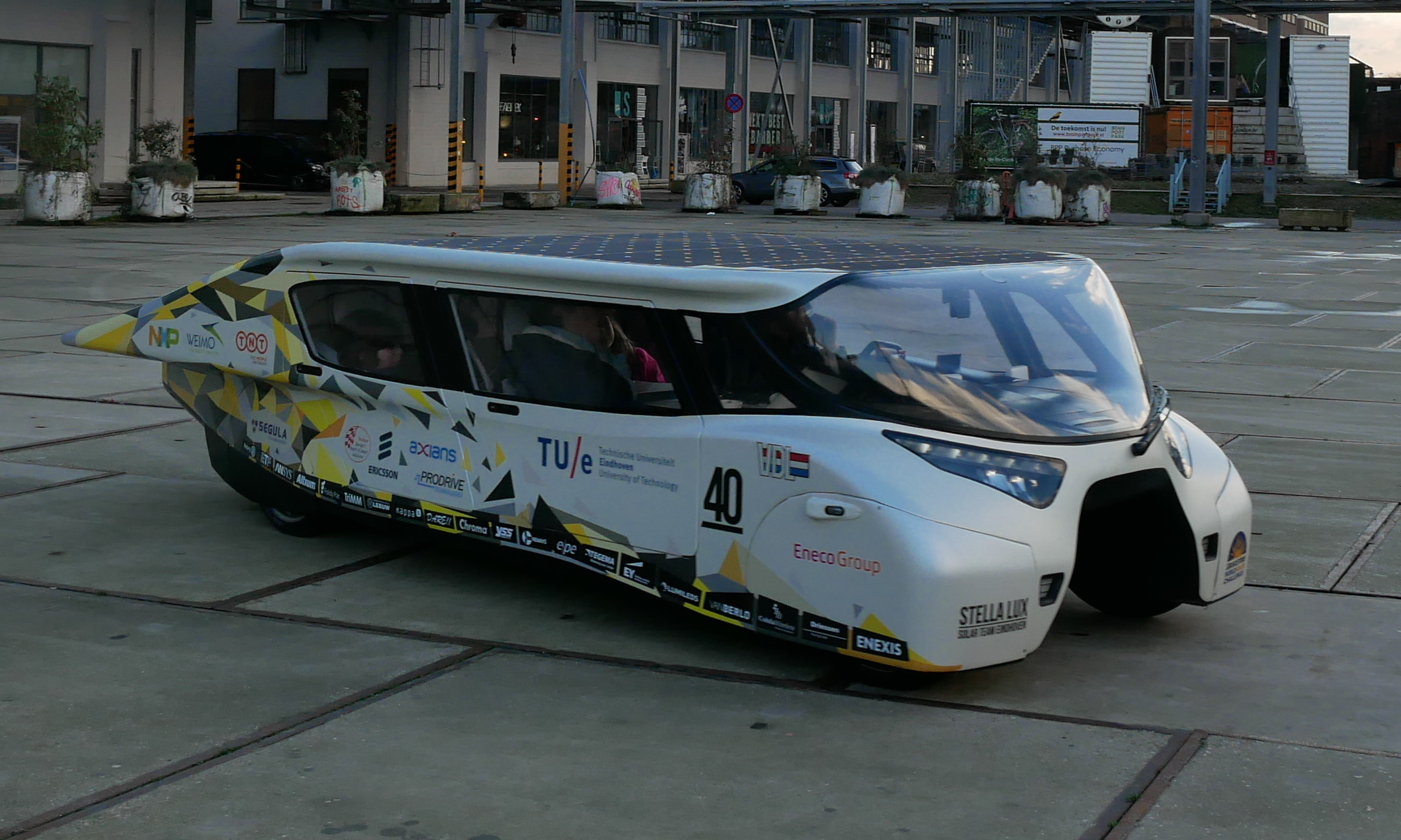
In 2015 Solar team Eindhoven won the Cruiser Class again with their Stella Lux "family car".

The 2015 WSC was held on 15–25 October with the same classes as the 2013 challenge.

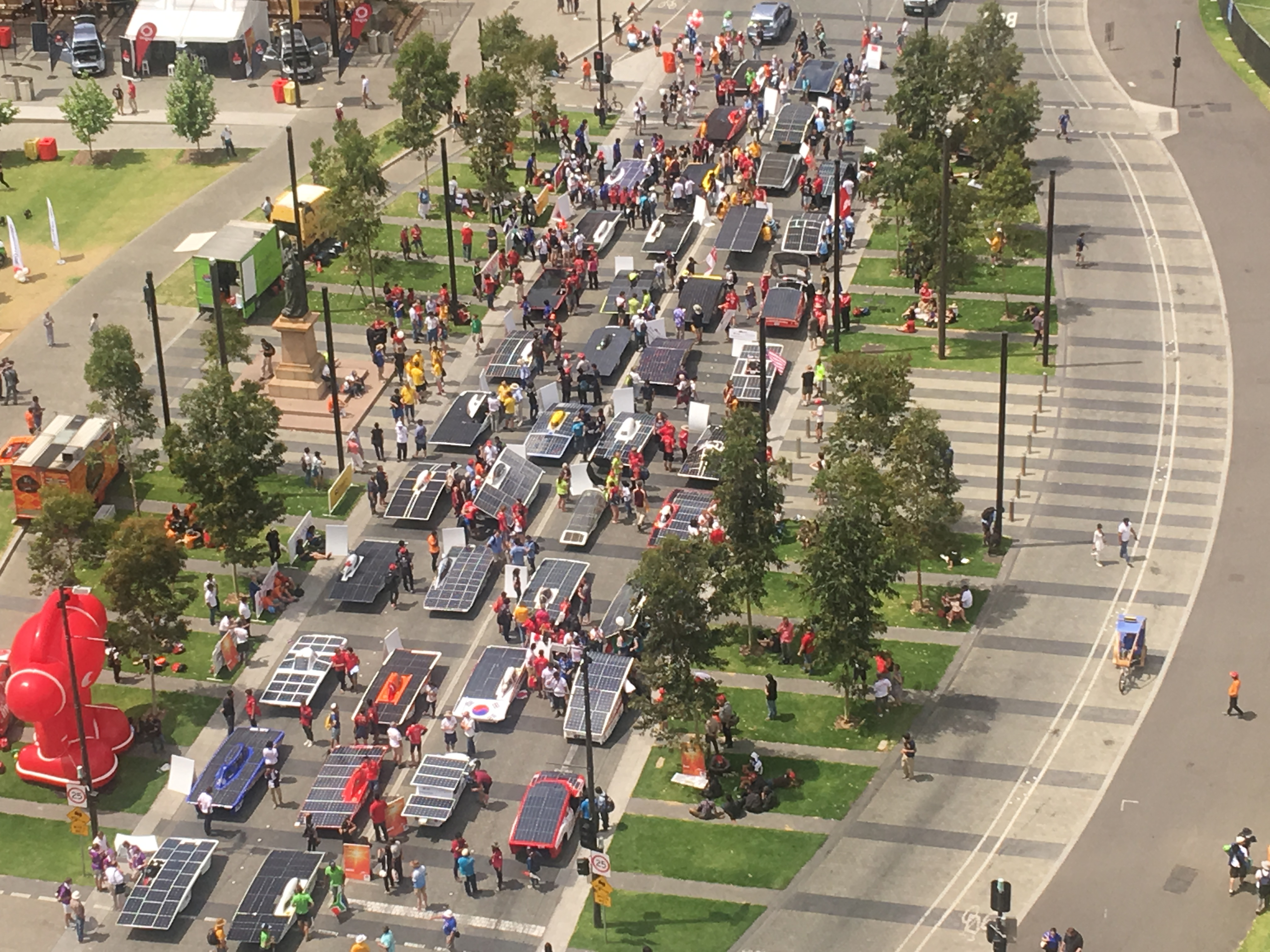
World Solar Challenge 2015-Parade at Victoria Square in Adelaide, Australia

In the Cruiser Class, the winner was once again Solar Team Eindhoven's Stella Lux from Eindhoven University of Technology in the Netherlands with an average speed of 76.73 km/h (47.68 mph), while the second place team was Kogakuin University from Japan who was the first to cross the finish line, but did not receive as many points for passenger-kilometers and practicality. Bochum took 3rd place this year with the latest in their series of cruiser cars.

Cruiser Results
| Rank | Team | Country | Distance (km) | Time (hr:mn) | Person kilometers | External energy (kWh) | Practicality (%) | Final score (%) |
|---|---|---|---|---|---|---|---|---|
| 1 | TU Eindhoven | Netherlands | 3022 | 39:23 | 6044 | 29.68 | 84.5 | 97.27 |
| 2 | Kogakuin University | Japan | 3022 | 37:52 | 3022 | 29.71 | 51.75 | 93.61 |
| 3 | HS Bochum | Germany | 3022 | 48:30 | 4528 | 29.68 | 80.5 | 82.91 |
| 4 | sUNSWift UNSW Sydney | Australia | 3022 | 54:03 | 3022 | 29.68 | 54.0 | 72.91 |
| 5 | University of Minnesota | United States | 3022 | 58:27 | 4009 | 29.68 | 38.5 | 68.21 |
| 6 | Ardingly College | UK | | | 0 | 12.5 | 61.75 | 42.93 |
| 7 | Lodz University of Technology | Poland | | | 2113 | 29.83 | 63.5 | 24.19 |
| 8 | Hong Kong Institute of Vocational Education | Hong Kong | | | 896 | 29.83 | 51.5 | 21.41 |
| 9 | Singapore Polytechnic | Singapore | | | 768 | 29.97 | 50 | 21.41 |
| 10 | Sepuluh Nopember Institute of Technology | Indonesia | | | 1036 | 29.43 | 42.5 | 21.00 |
| 11 | University of Tehran | Iran | | | 1161 | 29.97 | 35.75 | 20.05 |

In the Challenger Class, the team from Delft University of Technology retained the title with Nuna 8 and an average speed of 91.75 km/h (57.01 mph), while their Dutch counterparts, the University of Twente, who led most of the challenge, finished just 8 minutes behind them in second place, making 2015 the closest finish in WSC history. Tokai University passed the University of Michigan on the last day of the event to take home the bronze.

Challenger results
| Rank | Team | Country | Distance (km) | Time (hr:mn) | Speed (km/h) |
|---|---|---|---|---|---|
| 1 | Nuon | Netherlands | 3022 | 37:56 | 91.75 |
| 2 | University of Twente | Netherlands | 3022 | 38:04 | 91.63 |
| 3 | Tokai University | Japan | 3022 | 38:50 | 89.41 |
| 4 | University of Michigan | United States | 3022 | 38:54 | 89.29 |
| 5 | Punch Powertrain (KU Leuven) | Belgium | 3022 | 39:19 | 88.10 |
| 6 | Stanford University | United States | 3022 | 41:24 | 83.14 |
| 7 | GAMF Hungary | Hungary | 3022 | 43:04 | 79.70 |
| 8 | Team Arrow | Australia | 3022 | 45:22 | 76.71 |
| 9 | EAFIT-EPM | Colombia | 3022 | 46:19 | 73:29 |
| 10 | University of Western Sydney | Australia | 3022 | 46:51 | 72.21 |
| 11 | North-West University | South Africa | 3022 | 47:22 | 71.70 |
| 12 | University of Toronto | Canada | 3022 | 47:40 | 70.91 |
| 13 | University of KwaZulu-Natal | South Africa | 3022 | 47:53 | 70.40 |
| 14 | GOKO High School | Japan | 3022 | 50:22 | 66.74 |
| 15 | Jonkoping University | Sweden | 3022 | 50:36 | 66.39 |
| 16 | Nagoya Institute of Technology | Japan | 3022 | 50:42 | 66.25 |
| 17 | Principia College | United States | 3022 | 54:51 | 60.62 |
| 18 | Kanazawa Institute of Technology | Japan | 3022 | 56:24 | 58.91 |
| 19 | Anadolu University | Turkey | 3022 | 57:48 | 58.00 |
| 20 | Kookmin University | Korea | 3022 | 60:00 | 54.78 |
| 21 | University of Adelaide | Australia | 2292 | | |
| 22 | Cambridge University | UK | 2047 | | |
| 23 | Massachusetts Institute of Technology | United States | 1835 | | |
| 24 | Beijing Institute of Technology | China | 1823 | | |
| 25 | Dokuz Eylül University | Turkey | 1575 | | |
| 26 | MARA University of Technology | Malaysia | 97 | | |
| 27 | Durham University | UK | 0 | | |

The Adventure Class was won by the Houston High School solar car team from Houston, Mississippi, United States.

Adventure results
| Rank | Team | Country | Distance (km) |
|---|---|---|---|
| 1 | Houston HS | United States | 2441 |
| 2 | TAFE SA | Australia | 1289 |
| 3 | Liberty Christian School | United States | 1288 |

=== 2017 ===
The 2017 WSC was held on 8–15 October, featuring the same classes as 2015. The Dutch NUON team won again in the Challenger class, which concluded on 2017-10-12, and in the Cruiser Class, the winner was once again Solar Team Eindhoven, from the Netherlands as well.

Challenger results
| Rank | Team | Car name | Country | Distance (km) | Average speed ((km/h)) |
|---|---|---|---|---|---|
| 1 | Nuon Solar Team | Nuna9 | Netherlands | 3021 km | 81.2 km/h |
| 2 | University of Michigan Solar Car Team | Novum | United States | 3021 km | 77.1 km/h |
| 3 | Punch Powertrain Solar Team | Punch Two | Belgium | 3021 km | 76.2 km/h |
| 4 | Tokai University | Tokai Challenger | Japan | 3021 km | 75.9 km/h |
| 5 | Solar Team Twente | RED Shift | Netherlands | 3021 km | 75.6 km/h |
| 6 | Western Sydney Solar Team | Unlimited 2.0 | Australia | 3021 km | 65.5 km/h |
| 7 | Kogakuin University Solar Team | Wing | Japan | 3021 km | 63.8 km/h |
| 8 | 46. JUsolarteam | Solveig | Sweden | 3021 km | 59.7 km/h |
| 9 | 16. Stanford Solar Car Project | Sundae | United States | 3021 km | 59.5 km/h |
| 10 | 4. Antakari Solar Team | INTIKALLPA IV | Chile | 3021 km | 59.1 km/h |
| 11 | 77. Blue Sky Solar Racing | Polaris | Canada | 3021 km | 58.6 km/h |
| 12 | 25. NITech Solar Racing | Horizon 17 | Japan | 3021 km | 58.0 km/h |

Cruiser results
| Rank | Team | Car name | Country | Charges | P-km | External energy | Efficiency (P-km/kWh) | Efficiency score |
|---|---|---|---|---|---|---|---|---|
| 1 | Solar Team Eindhoven | Stella Vie | Netherlands | 6 | 10197 | 45.7 kWh | 223.2 | 80 |
| 2 | HS Bochum SolarCar-Team | Thyssenkrupp Blue.Cruiser | Germany | 6 | 7865 | 88.2 kWh | 89.2 | 32 |
| 3 | Clenergy Team Arrow | Arrow STF | Australia | 6 | 5263 | 91.5 kWh | 57.5 | 20.6 |
| 4 | IVE Solar Car Team | SOPHIE VI | Hong Kong | 6 | 3021 | 45.4 kWh | 66.5 | 0 |
| 5 | University of Minnesota Solar Vehicle Project | Eos II | United States | 6 | 3644 | 40.5 kWh | 90 | 0 |

Adventure results
| Team | Car name | Country | Arrival time |
|---|---|---|---|
| Mississippi Choctaw High School Solar Car Team | Tushka Hashi III | United States | 10/13/2018 13:56 |
| NWU Solar | Naledi | South Africa | 10/13/2018 15:40 |
| Principia Solar Car | Ra X | United States | 10/14/2018 08:39 |
| Adelaide University Solar Racing Team | Lumen II | Australia | 10/14/2018 09:35 |
| MDH Solar Team | MDH Solar Car | Sweden | 10/14/2018 09:40 |
| GOKO HIGH SCHOOL | MUSOUSHIN | Japan | 10/14/2018 09:43 |
| KUST (Kookmin University Solar car Team) | Taegeuk | South Korea | 10/14/2018 10:24 |
| Illini Solar Car | Argo | United States | 10/14/2018 10:47 |
| Team Sonnenwagen Aachen | HUAWEI Sonnenwagen | Germany | 10/14/2018 10:50 |
| MTAA Super Sol Invictus | MTAA Super Charge | Australia | 10/14/2018 11:05 |
| PrISUm | Penumbra | United States | 10/13/2018 13:25 |
| SunSPEC | SunSPEC5 | Singapore | 10/13/2018 12:49 |
| UiTM Eco Photon | TUAH | Malaysia | 10/14/2018 11:20 |
| UNSW Solar Racing Team Sunswift | Violet | Australia | 10/13/2018 09:51 |
| Flinders Automotive Solar Team | Investigator Mk III | Australia | 10/13/2018 14:53 |
| University of Tehran Solar Car Team | Persian Gazelle IV | Iran | 10/16/2018 17:00 |
| Durham University Electric Motorsport | DUSC | United Kingdom | 10/14/2018 12:52 |
| STC-2 Nikola | Nikola | Thailand | 10/13/2018 11:40 |
| ITU Solar Car Team | B.O.W. ISTANBUL | Turkey | 10/14/2018 12:16 |
| RVCE Solar Car Team | ARKA | India | 10/16/2018 17:00 |
| Lodz Solar Team | Eagle Two | Poland | 10/13/2018 15:05 |
| TAFE SA | SAV | Australia | 10/13/2018 10:51 |
| National Kaohsiung University of Applied Sciences (KUAS) & St. John's University Solar Car Team | Apollo VIII | Taiwan | 10/14/2018 08:46 |

=== 2019 ===
The 2019 WSC was held from 13 to 20 October. 53 teams from 24 countries entered the competition, featuring the same three classes, Challenger (30 teams), Cruiser (23 teams) and Adventure. In the Challenger class, Agoria Solar Team (formerly Punch Powertrain) won for the first time. Tokai University Solar Car Team finished in second place.

In the Cruiser class, Solar Team Eindhoven won their fourth consecutive title. Despite multiple incidents on the road, Team Sonnenwagen Aachen managed to beat other teams and finished in 6th position.

Several teams had mishaps. Vattenfall was leading when their car Nuna X caught fire. The driver was uninjured, but the vehicle was destroyed. It was the first no-finish for that team in 20 years. Others were badly affected by strong winds.

Dutch team Twente was leading the journey at 100 km/h (62 mph), when their car was forced off the road by winds and rolled over. The driver was taken to hospital. Within 30 minutes team Sonnenwagen Aachen was also blown off the road north of Coober Pedy, the driver was not hurt. An 80 km/h (50 mph) speed limit was then imposed by event officials, lifted when conditions improved. The day before, wind damage to solar panels put the team from Western Sydney University out of the challenge. The driver of Agoria from Belgium escaped injury when their vehicle was "uprooted" at 100 km/h (62 mph) by severe winds, but still went on to win the Challenger class.

Challenger results
| Rank | Team | Car name | Country | Distance (km) | Average speed ((km/h)) |
|---|---|---|---|---|---|
| 1 | Agoria Solar Team | Bluepoint | Belgium | 3019 km | 86.6 km/h |
| 2 | Tokai University Solar Car Team | Tokai Challenger | Japan | 3019 km | 86.1 km/h |
| 3 | University of Michigan Solar Car Team | Electrum | USA | 3019 km | 79.6 km/h |
| 4 | Top Dutch Solar Racing | Green Lightning | Netherlands | 3019 km | 78.4 km/h |
| 5 | Kogakuin University Solar Team | Kute Eagle | Japan | 3019 km | 72.1 km/h |
| 6 | Team Sonnenwagen Aachen e.V. | Covestro Sonnenwagen | Germany | 3019 km | 71.8 km/h |
| 7 | Antakari Solar Team | INTIKALLPA V | Chile | 3019 km | 66.9 km/h |
| 8 | Nagoya Institute of Technology Solar Racing | Horizon Ace | Japan | 3019 km | 66.5 km/h |
| 9 | Eclipse | Eclipse X | Canada | 3019 km | 65.1 km/h |
| 10 | JU Solar Team | Axelent | Sweden | 3019 km | 64.6 km/h |
| 11 | Blue Sky Solar Racing | Viridian | Canada | 3019 km | 63.2 km/h |

Cruiser results
| Rank | Team | Country | Stages completed | Score |
|---|---|---|---|---|
| 1 | Solar Team Eindhoven | Netherlands | 3 | 111.7 |
| 2 | sUNSWift UNSW Sydney | Australia | 3 | 56.1 |
| 3 | IVE Engineering Solar Car Team | Hong Kong | 3 | 44.2 |
| 4 | SolarCar-Team Hochschule Bochum | Germany | 1 | 48.4 |
| 5 | Sun Shuttle | China | 1 | 17.4 |
| 6 | University of Minnesota | USA | 1 | 14.6 |

Adventure results

=== 2021 ===
In response to the COVID-19 pandemic in Australia the WSC closed entries three months earlier than normal, on 18 December 2020. They were then to "… review all current government measures relating to social distancing, density and contact tracing, international travel restrictions and isolation requirements." On 12 February 2021, the South Australian Government confirmed the cancellation of the 2021 staging of the event. While the COVID-19 pandemic was not explicitly cited as the reason, the "complexities of international border closures" affecting Australia at the time appear to be the primary reason for the event's cancellation. The same statement also noted the next event would take place in October 2023 - at least 962 days from the date of announcement, and resulting in a four-year gap between events. Registered teams should receive a full refund of all fees.

=== 2023 ===
The 2023 World Solar Challenge was held from October 22-29. At the beginning of the race, 31 teams were participating, with 23 in the Challenger division and 8 in the Cruiser division. The Challenger division was won by defending champions Innoptus (formerly Agoria) with an average speed of 88.2km/h, and the Cruiser division was won by UNSW Sunswift with a score of 91.1. Uniquely, no Cruisers were able to finish the race this year.

Many of the leading teams faced trouble during the competition. Dutch team Top Dutch raced on a perovskite-tandem solar array damaged from testing in the month leading up to race. Michigan experienced electrical issues during qualifying and had to start last. German team Sonnenwagen was blown off the road just outside of Port Agusta and had to withdraw due to new regulations. Tokai had to stop for several hours on Day 4 to repair their car after sustaining damage from crossing a cattle grid. Kogakuin had consistent problems with their MPPT charge controller, and reported in an Instagram post that their panels were generating less than half the power than they should have been. On the fifth day of the competition, only 4 teams (Innoptus, Twente, Brunel, and Michigan) had finished the course, and by the official end of timing, only 12 teams made it to the finish line successfully.

Challenger results
| Rank | Team | Car name | Country | Distance (km) | Average speed (km/h) |
|---|---|---|---|---|---|
| 1 | Innoptus Solar Team | Infinite | Belgium | 3022 | 88.65 |
| 2 | Solar Team Twente | RED X | Netherlands | 3022 | 87.78 |
| 3 | Brunel Solar Team | Nuna 12 | Netherlands | 3022 | 83.07 |
| 4 | University of Michigan Solar Car Team | Astrum | United States | 3022 | 79.3 |
| 5 | Tokai University Solar Car Team | Tokai Challenger | Japan | 3022 | 74.6 |
| 6 | Top Dutch Solar Racing | Green Thunder | Netherlands | 3022 | 72.9 |
| 7 | JU Solar Team | Axelight | Sweden | 3022 | 65.2 |
| 8 | Kogakuin University Solar Team | Koga | Japan | 3022 | 64.9 |
| 9 | Western Sydney Solar Team | Unlimited 5.0 | Australia | 3022 | 64.7 |
| 10 | Eclipse ÉTS | Eclipse XI | Canada | 3022 | 64.2 |
| 11 | Durham University Solar Car | DUSC2023 | United Kingdom | 3022 | 62.9 |
| 12 | ACE Solar Racing | Aletsch | Switzerland | 3022 | 61.4 |
| 13 | Team Sonnenwagen Aachen | Covestro Adelie | Germany | 2718 | 78.8 |
| 14 | Goko High School | Musoushin23 | Japan | 2718 | 59.6 |
| 15 | Blue Sky Solar Racing | Borealis | Canada | 2718 | 59.3 |
| 16 | Chalmers Solar Team | Allsvinn | Sweden | 2718 | 55.8 |
| 17 | Adelaide University Solar Racing Team | Lumen II | Australia | 1210 | 50.2 |
| 18 | Halmstad University Solar Team | Sven | Sweden | 987 | 46.9 |
| 19 | Wakayama University Solar Car Team | Orca | Japan | 632 | 44.6 |
| 20 | ITU ZES Solar Car Team | ARIBA ZES XE | Turkey | 332 | 52.7 |
| 21 | ANU Solar Racing | Solar Spirit | Australia | 332 | 36.3 |
| 22 | TeamArrow | Arrow 3 | Australia | | |
| 23 | TUCN Solar Racing Team | SolisEV3 | Romania | | |

Cruiser results
| Rank | Team | Car name | Country | Points |
|---|---|---|---|---|
| 1 | Sunswift Racing | SUNSWIFT 7 | Australia | 91.1 |
| 2 | University of Minnesota Solar Vehicle Project | Gaia | USA | 22.4 |
| 3 | Solaride | Solaride 2 | Estonia | 14.7 |

=== 2025 ===
The 2025 World Solar Challenge was held from August 24-31, with an entry of 34 teams. The new regulations have allowed for an increase in solar array size from 4m^{2} to 6m^{2}. Also the race was the first held in the Australian winter, creating cooler conditions for drivers but reduced sunlight, increasing the challenge. The Brunel Solar Team from the Netherlands won, narrowly beating fellow Dutch team Twente and Belgium’s Innoptus. Brunel’s catamaran Nuna 13 featured two side fins to capture wind for extra speed and stability. Notably, the field saw four different teams with fin-like aerodynamic thrust devices on their cars. The concept, while being explored previously, has gained major interest from teams after Innoptus Solar Team’s 2023 win with such a device on their car.

Challenger results
| Rank | Team | Car name | Country | Distance (km) | Average speed (km/h) |
|---|---|---|---|---|---|
| 1 | Brunel Solar Team | Nuna 13 | Netherlands | 3022 | 86.6 |
| 2 | Solar Team Twente | RED Discover | Netherlands | 3022 | 86.0 |
| 3 | Innoptus Solar Team | Infinite Apollo | Belgium | 3022 | 85.3 |
| 4 | Sonnenwagen Aachen | Covestro Æthon | Germany | 3022 | 82.7 |
| 5 | Tokai University | Tokai Challenger | Japan | 3022 | 80.8 |
| 6 | Western Sydney | Unlimited 6.0 | Australia | 3022 | 80.8 |
| 7 | Michigan | Millennium | United States | 3022 | 79.8 |
| 8 | JUST | Nova Lumina | Sweden | 3022 | 78.6 |
| 9 | Eclipse ETS | Éclipse XII | Canada | 3022 | 77.4 |
| 10 | Neumann Solar Team | Neumann Solar | Hungary | 3022 | 69.1 |
| 11 | ACE Solar Racing | Silvretta | Switzerland | 3022 | 67.6 |
| 12 | Chalmers | Arvaker | Sweden | 3022 | 67.1 |
| 13 | Kogakuin University | Cygnus | Japan | 3022 | 64.8 |
| 14 | Osaka Sangyo University | Scewera | Japan | 3022 | 61.4 |
| 15 | Top Dutch Solar Racing | Green Falcon | Netherlands | 2718 | 64.0 |
| 16 | Seoul National University (Official) | SNUONE | South Korea | 2718 | 60.2 |
| 17 | Wakayama University | YATA | Japan | 2718 | 59.8 |
| 18 | Solis Solar Car Team | Hyperion | Romania | 2718 | 59.1 |
| 19 | Australian National University | Monty | Australia | 1210 | 52.5 |
| 20 | Iron Lions Solar Car Team | Aurora | United States | 322 | 44.7 |
| 21 | TUfast Eco Team | Lux25 | Germany | 322 | 43.2 |
| 22 | Seoul National University (Solo) | SNU Solo | South Korea | 322 | 35.4 |
| – | AUSRT | Lumen III | Australia | 0 | 0.0 |
| – | Halmstad University | Henry | Sweden | 0 | 0.0 |
| – | AgniRath Solar Team | Aagneya | India | 0 | 0.0 |
| – | SASVA Solar Team | Sun Sprite | Australia | 0 | 0.0 |

Cruiser results
| Rank | Team | Car name | Country | Distance (km) | Average speed (km/h) | Practicality (%) |
|---|---|---|---|---|---|---|
| 1 | VTC | Sophie | Hong Kong | 3022 | 68.7 | 67.2 |
| 2 | Solaride | Solaride III Enefit | Estonia | 3022 | 68.6 | 87.8 |
| 3 | Onda Solare | Emilia 5.9 | Italy | 3022 | 64.3 | 76.5 |
| 4 | Apollo Solar Car team | Apollo IX plus | Taiwan | 2718 | 60.8 | 76.4 |
| 5 | Deakin University Solar Team | DUST | Australia | 2718 | 60.6 | 73.3 |
| 6 | Sunswift Racing | Sunswift 7 | Australia | 2718 | 59.7 | 79.5 |
| 7 | Minnesota | Gaia | United States | 1209 | 52.2 | 68.3 |
| NC | Archimede | Thalia | Italy | 0 | 0 | 50.0 |

Event Safety Award - Eclipse solar car

Bridgestone Australia E8 Commitment Award - Iron Lions Racing

CSIRO Technical Innovation Award - Onda Solare - Università di Bologna

=== 2027 ===
The 2027 World Solar Challenge will be held from August 22 to August 29. The regulations have not changed significantly from the 2025 regulations.

== See also ==
- Solar car racing
- List of prototype solar-powered cars
- List of solar car teams
- Shell Eco-marathon
- The Quiet Achiever, the world's first solar-powered racecar

=== Other solar vehicle challenges ===
- American Solar Challenge, a biennial United States event held since 1990 that has previously included Canada
- Formula Sun Grand Prix, an annual U.S. event held on race tracks.
- The Solar Car Challenge, an annual event for High School students from the U.S. and (to a lesser extent) other parts of the world, first held in 1995
- South African Solar Challenge, a biennial South African event that was first held in 2008
- Victorian Model Solar Vehicle Challenge, an annual event in Australia for schoolchildren
- European Solar Challenge, a biennial 24-hour race in Belgium
- Atacama Solar Race, a biennial event held in Chile in the years 2011, 2012, 2014, 2016 and 2018.

=== Movies ===
- Race the Sun, a movie loosely based on a participating team
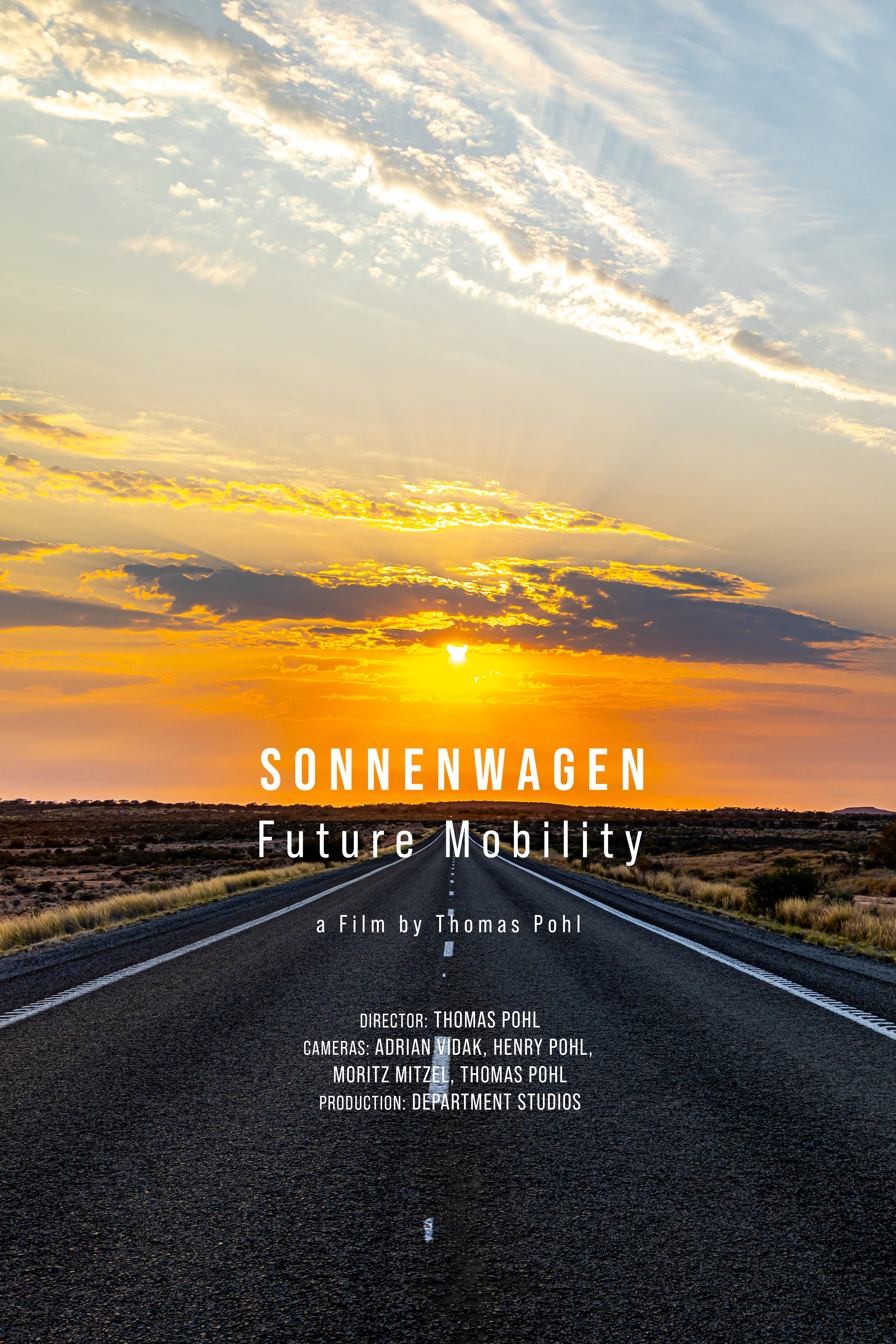
- Sonnenwagen - Future Mobility
  Sonnenwagen - Future Mobility, a documentary about the German participating team Sonnenwagen.
