= Aurora Solar Car =

Aurora Vehicle Association Inc.
- Type: Incorporated
- Industry: Solar Cars
- Founded: 1980
- Headquarters: Melbourne, Victoria, Australia
- Key people: Andris Samsons(Chairman)
- Website: Aurora Solar Car Website

The Aurora Vehicle Association is a group of volunteers who are dedicated to achieving and demonstrating extreme efficiency in transport. Aurora was started in 1980 by building high-fuel-efficiency petrol-powered vehicles. Between 1983 and 1985 Aurora held the world record for fuel economy at 1808 km per litre (5107 miles per imperial gallon). In 1987, when Hans Tholstrup devised the first trans-Australian World Solar Challenge, Aurora turned to solar car development and has been a contestant in every World Solar Challenge and has achieved 1 win, 4 second places, 1 third place, 1 fifth place, 1 sixth place and 1 crash.

Aurora is a non-profit group which is sustained by corporate sponsorship from companies such as CSIRO, Mazda and Sumitomo (amongst many others).

At various points in its history, Aurora has also been associated with some of Australia's leading universities such as UNSW, University of Technology, Sydney, University of Melbourne and RMIT.

== Cars ==
Aurora have constructed several solar-powered cars and are now in their 4th generation of car designs.

Ford Model "S" - 1987

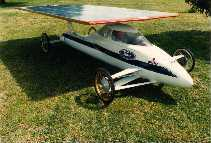
Ford Model 'S'
Specifications
Overall length	5.5 meters
Overall width	2.0 meters
Weight	250 kg
Top speed	100 km/h
Drag coefficient	0.26
Solar Panel	1400 watts

Christine - 1990

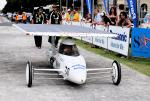
Christine
Specifications
Overall length	3.1 meters
Overall width	1.6 meters
Weight	180 kg
Top speed	112 km/h
Drag coefficient	Cd 0.27
Solar Panel	1100 watts

Aurora Q1 - 1993

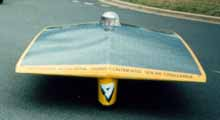
Aurora Q1
Specifications
Overall length	4.41 meters
Overall width	2.0 meters
Weight	220 kg
Top speed	112 km/h
Drag coefficient	Cd 0.095 with race array, 0.08 with prototype smooth array.
Solar Panel	1300 watts

Southern Aurora - 2000

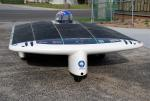
Southern Aurora
Specifications
Overall length	4.58 meters
Overall width	2 meters
Weight	215 kg
Top speed	122 km/h
Drag coefficient	
Solar Panel	1500 watts

Aurora 101 - 1996

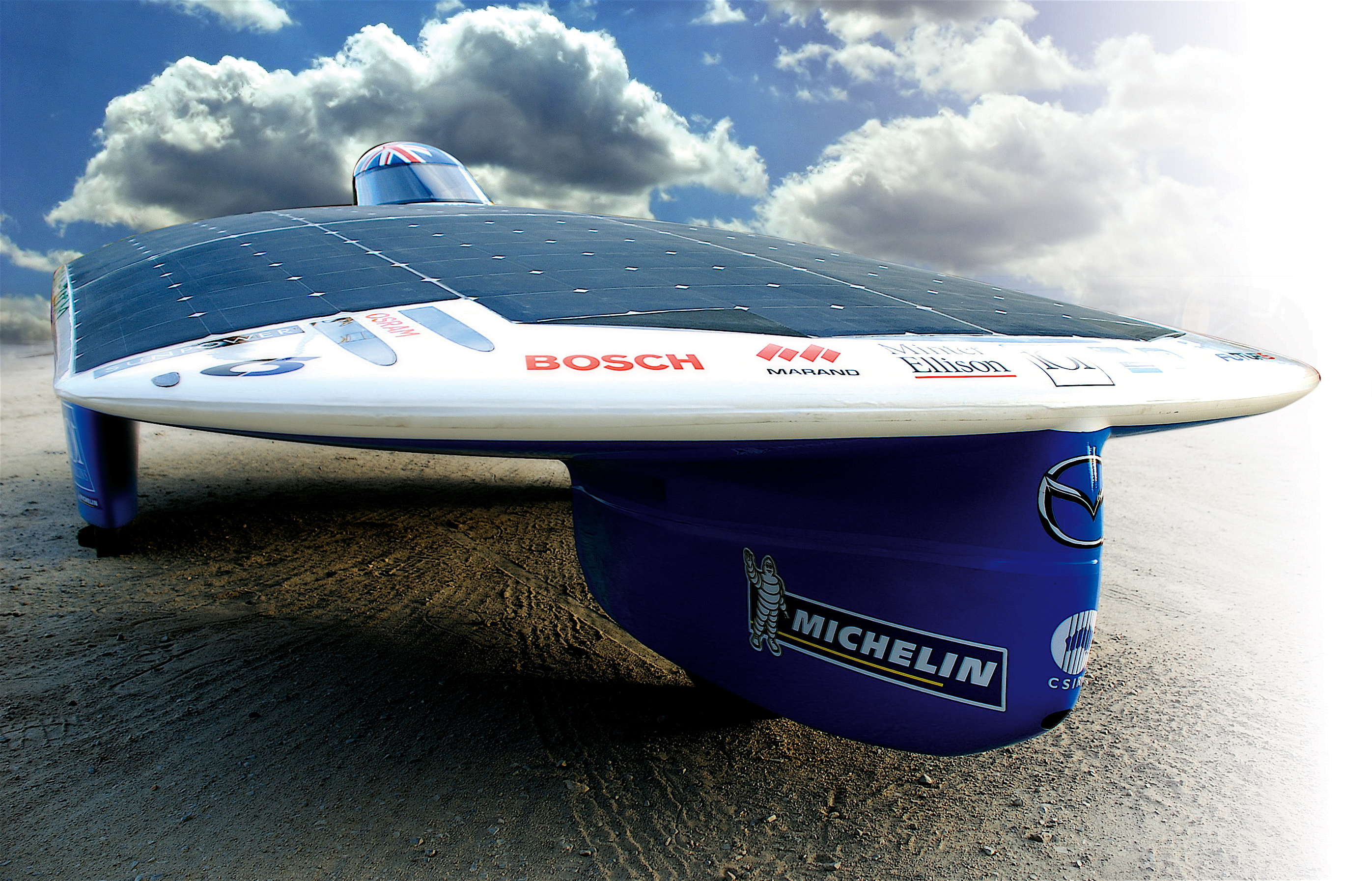
Aurora 101 4th Generation
Specifications
Overall length	4.1 meters
Overall width	1.8 meters
Weight	130 kg
Top speed	152 km/h
Drag coefficient	Cd 0.08
Solar Panel	1250 watts

The current flagship is known as Aurora Evolution (Previously Aurora 101). The car weighs 120 kg without batteries or a driver and has attained speeds of 155 km/h. It is built around a triangular carbon fibre frame (with a circular cross section) with a single driven front wheel and two rear wheels. The car's body is attached to the frame at three points through springs and shock absorbers.

The car is extremely aerodynamic, with a drag coefficient of 0.1 and a frontal area of 0.76 square metres. The motor, which was developed as a joint effort between CSIRO, the University of Technology, Sydney and Aurora, weighs 15 kg and has a continuous operating power of 1.8 kW.

The car's power comes from its solar array, which covers a majority of the upper half of its body. There is a total of 5.98 square metres of silicon solar cells, which originally provided up to 1250 W but now provides closer to 1200 W due to degradation. In full racing trim (as per the World Solar Challenge rules) the car weighs 240 kg with its batteries and driver.

Aurora 101 finished second in the 2003 WSC race

Aurora 101 finished 3rd in the 2007 WSC race.

- Fastest lap at Hidden Valley Racetrack, Darwin Average speed 91.83 km/h.
- Fastest lap at Suzuka Racetrack Average speed 93.08 km/h.
- Distance covered in 24 hours non-stop record 1590 km.

== World Records ==
Year	Record
1983	Shell Mileage Marathon. 2,948 mpg
1984	Shell Mileage Marathon. 3,133 mpg
1985	Shell Mileage Marathon. 5,107 mpg
1994	Trans-Continental Solar Challenge. Perth to Sydney, 4,000 km, 8.5 days
1998	Citipower SunRace. Adelaide to Sydney. 2,080 km. Average 100.9 km/h over 100 km
2000	Sydney to Melbourne Day Record: 877 km
2002	13,054 km in 24 days - Long distance solar car journey.
2002	780 km Longest day distance on solar energy
2002	111.2 km/h Highest on-road average speed for 100 km
2002	16,660 km (since 1993) Longest distance solar car driver
2002	131.0 km/h for 100 miles (est. 1994 Biel 121.6 km/h)
2002	131.5 km/h for One Hour (est. 1994 Biel 123.0 km/h)
2002	132.1 km/h for 100 km (est. 1994 Biel 124.3 km/h)
2002	86.2 km/h on solar energy alone (est. 1994 Biel 82.6 km/h)
2004	1255 km in 24 hours
2005	1701 km in 24 hours
2007	World record distance for a battery powered car, in 'Christine', 811 km at 53.05 km/h

== Aurora in WSC ==
Event year	Placing	Average Speed	Qualification Grid Position
1987	2nd Place	44.48 km/h	4
1990	6th Place, 1st in Class (Lead Acid)	50.20 km/h	13
1993	5th Place	70.08 km/h	17
1996	Did not finish	-	9
1999	1st Place	72.96 km/h	7
2001	2nd Place	90.26 km/h	5
2003	2nd Place	91.90 km/h	1
2005	2nd Place	92.03 km/h	1
2007	3rd Overall, 1st in Class	85.00 km/h	3
2009	6th Place	70.82 km/h	1
