= Stanford Solar Car Project =

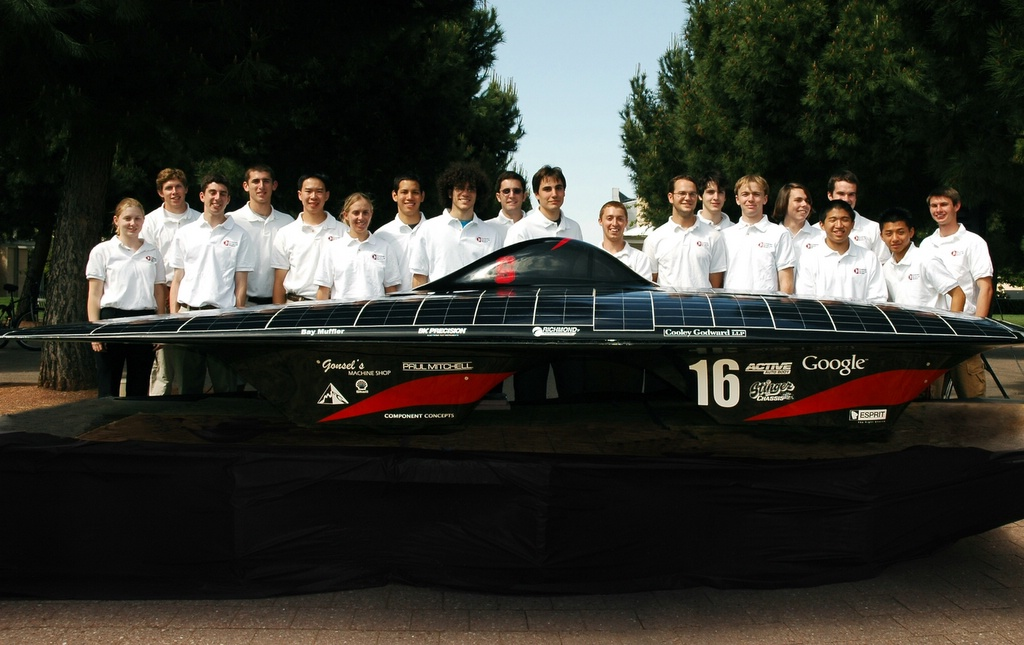
2005 Stanford Solar Car Project members with their car, Solstice

The Stanford Solar Car Project (SSCP) is a student group at Stanford University that designs, builds, tests, and races solar-powered vehicles. The SSCP, a student-run, donation-funded organization, has been building and racing solar-powered vehicles since 1986. It has competed and placed at The World Solar Challenge, the Global Green Challenge, and American Solar Challenge.

The Stanford Solar Car Project has historically prided itself on being a completely student-run project. There is no faculty involvement at a managerial or technical level; faculty involvement is limited to advocacy and fundraising.

The project is open to Stanford students in all fields of study and seeks to educate groups on and off campus about applied engineering and renewable energy. The project works at the Volkswagen Automotive Innovation Lab, a building shared with the Stanford DARPA Grand Challenge team, the Dynamic Design Lab, and other automotive research groups. However, work on the car continues at all times during the week, especially in the weeks and months leading up to a race.

The team’s newest vehicle, Azimuth, was completed in the summer of 2024, and subsequently placed second in the 2025 Electrek Formula Sun Grand Prix in Bowling Green, KY.

== Past cars ==
The Stanford Solar Car Project has a long history of designing and racing innovative solar-powered race cars. Past cars include SUnSUrfer, SUnBurner, AfterBurner, AfterBurner II, Third Degree Burner, BackBurner (an alumni project), Back 2 Back Burner, Solstice, Equinox, Apogee, Xenith, Luminos, and Arctan.

Afterburner (1996–97) had ASE 800 watts solar cells, used a 300 pounds (140 kg) lead-acid battery, and weighed 800 pounds (360 kg) in U.S. competitions. In Japanese competitions an 150 pounds (68 kg) battery was used.

=== Apogee ===
The team's ninth car, Apogee, placed 4th in its class and 10th overall at the 2009 Global Green Challenge in Australia, 4th overall in the 2010 American Solar Challenge, and 10th in its class at the World Solar Challenge 2009.

=== Xenith ===
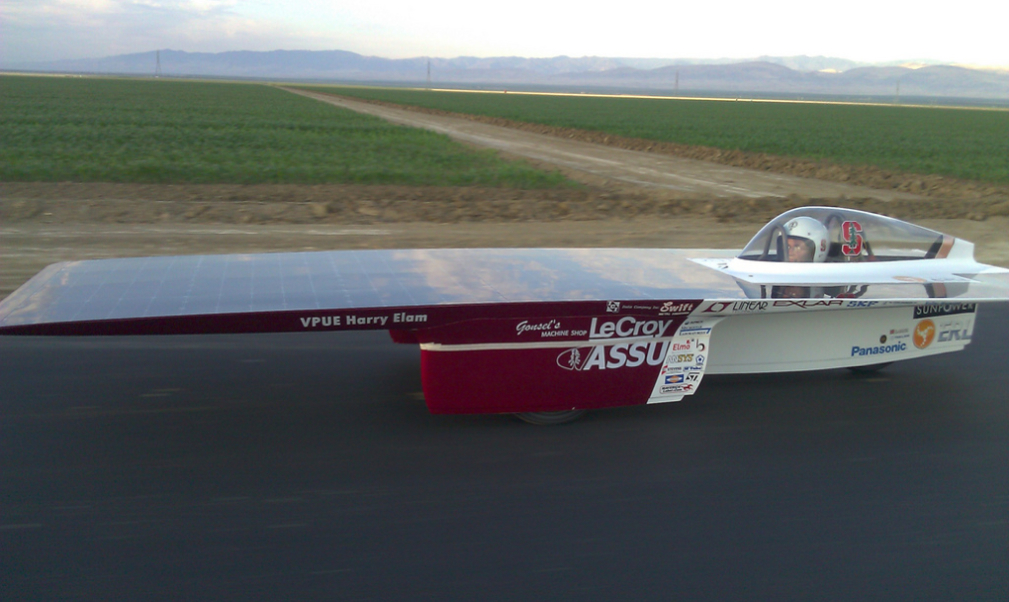
Xenith during a test drive in the San Joaquin Valley

Xenith, the team's tenth car, was unveiled on August 11, 2011 and placed 11th at the World Solar Challenge 2011. Xenith is a 375-pound vehicle that is powered entirely by the sun. Xenith features a three-wheel steering system, glass encapsulated solar panels, and a high-efficiency electric motor. It has a 4-inch thin chassis made of carbon fiber composites, titanium, and aluminum. The vehicle's two front wheels are controlled by a normal rack and pinion steering wheel, and the rear wheel is controlled by a linear actuator. The vehicle can travel at 55-60 mph under sun power alone, and it can reach higher speeds when using the reserve battery pack. The vehicle is the first solar-powered car to use flexible glass for panel encapsulation. The ultra-high-efficiency silicon panels use prototype glass from Corning and cells from SunPower. The team used a custom 98% efficient motor for the vehicle. An in house developed software program allows the team to model sunlight and shadows during the race in order to plan race strategies.

=== Luminos ===
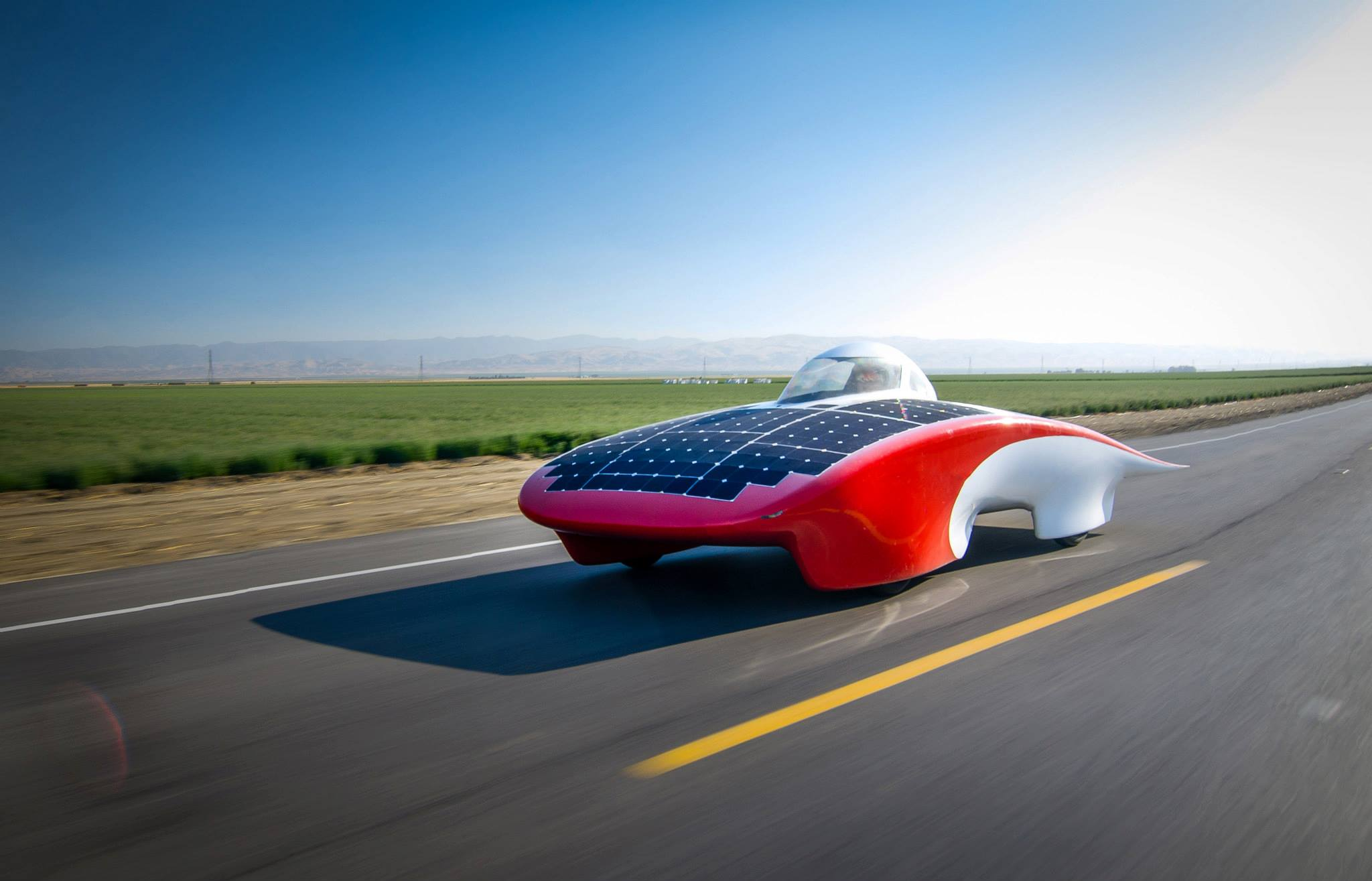
Luminos placed 4th at the 2013 World Solar Challenge.

Luminos, the team's eleventh car, was unveiled in the summer of 2013. It placed 4th in the Challenger class of the World Solar Challenge 2013, the best finish by an undergraduate team. Luminos was the team's most successful vehicle to date, proving sturdy and reliable with 10,000 safe miles successfully logged.

=== Arctan ===
Arctan, the team's twelfth car, was unveiled in July 2015. It placed 6th in the Challenger class at the 2015 World Solar Challenge. Arctan was built with the intention of being a slightly more aggressive improvement on the 2013 car, with a more aerodynamically efficient design without compromising on robustness. Arctan logged even more safe test drive miles than Luminos before it and finished the race 50% closer to the top team than in 2013.

=== Sundae ===
Sundae, the team's thirteenth car, was unveiled in July 2017. It placed 9th in the Challenger class at the 2017 World Solar Challenge out of 12 teams. The car was significantly smaller, being built in accordance with the new rules for the 2017 World Solar Challenge, which only allowed for four square meters of silicon solar cells. There were more aggressive aerobody optimizations applied compared to what had been done in the past.

=== Black Mamba ===
Black Mamba was the team's fourteenth car, developed for the 2019 racing season, and utilized a sleeker, more aerodynamic design. During the 2019 World Solar Challenge, Black Mamba suffered a battery fire. The driver was able to escape and the burning battery was pulled from the frame of the car, leaving hopes that Black Mamba may be repairable for future events.

== See also ==
- Battery electric vehicle
- Solar car racing
- Solar cell
- Composite material
- List of solar car teams
