= World Solar Challenge 2005 =

Biennial series of solar-powered car race

The 2005 World Solar Challenge was one of a biennial series of solar-powered car races, covering about 3,000 km (1,900 mi) through the Australian Outback, from Darwin, Northern Territory to Adelaide, South Australia.

Three teams completed the course out of 12 that started. The winner was a Nuna car built by Nuon of the Netherlands.

== Results ==
Rank	Team	Country	Speed (km/h)
1	Nuon	Netherlands	102.75
2	Aurora	Australia	92.03
3	University of Michigan	United States	90.03
4	Ashiya University	Japan	
5	Formosun	Taiwan	
6	Massachusetts Institute of Technology	United States	
7	Kaoshiung University	Taiwan	
8	Bochum	Germany	
9	University of Twente	Netherlands	
10	University of Calgary - Soleon	Canada	Production Class winner
11	Umicore	Belgium	
12	TAFE SA	Australia	
