= World Solar Challenge 2007 =

Solar-powered car races

The 2007 World Solar Challenge was one of a biennial series of solar-powered car races, covering 2,999 km (1,863 mi) through the Australian Outback, from Darwin, Northern Territory, to Adelaide, South Australia.

In the Challenge class 19 teams started, of which 10 completed the course, and the winner was a Nuna car built by Nuon of the Netherlands. In the Adventure class 18 teams started and eight completed the course, the winner being Ashiya University of Japan.

== Challenge class ==
Rank	Team	Country	Distance (km)	Time (hr:mn)	Speed (km/h)
1	Nuon	Netherlands	2999	33:00	90.87
2	Umicore	Belgium	2999	34:36	88.05
3	Aurora	Australia	2999	35:17	85.00
4	Bochum Solar World 1	Germany	2999	41:09	72.87
5	Southern Taiwan University	Taiwan	2999	44:08	67.95
6	University of Twente	Netherlands	2999	44:46	66.83
7	University of Michigan	United States	2999	44:55	66.76
8	University of Calgary	Canada	2999	51:43	57.98
9	University of Waterloo	Canada	2999	54:49	54.70
10	Helios	France	2999	59:24	50.80
11	Solar Fox	UK	2719		
12	Sinag	Philippines	2691		
13	Sun Speed	France	2002		
14	University of Chile	Chile	1862		
15	Queen's University	Canada	1345		
16	Leeming Senior High School	Australia (WA)	1050		
17	Gwawr	UK	740		
18	Heliox	Switzerland	735		
19	University of Malaya	Malaysia	250		

== Adventure class ==
Rank	Team	Country	Distance (km)	Time (hr:mn)	Speed (km/h)
1	Ashiya University	Japan	2999	32:03	93.57
2	Apollo	Taiwan	2999	35:43	83.96
3	Southern Aurora	Australia	2999	40:44	73.63
4	Sunswift	Australia	2999	44:11	67.88
5	University of Toronto	Canada	2999	46:19	64.74
6	Christine Aurora	Australia	2999	46:33	64.42
7	TAFE SA	Australia	2999	50:52	58.95
8	Salesian Polytechnic University	Japan	2999	58:19	51.42
9	Towards Tomorrow	Australia	2896		
10	University Tech Malaysia	Malaysia	2719		
11	HelioDet	Germany	2517		
12	Solar Fern	New Zealand	2233		
13	Stanford University	United States	1864		
14	University of Western Ontario	Canada	1680		
15	Hachinohe Institute of Technology	Japan	1675		
16	Polytechnique Montreal	Canada	1772		
17	Willetton	Australia (WA)	729		
18	Houston HS	United States	143		
