= World Solar Challenge 2003 =

Solar-powered car races

The 2003 World Solar Challenge was one of a biennial series of solar-powered car races, covering about 3,000 km (1,900 mi) through the Australian Outback, from Darwin, Northern Territory to Adelaide, South Australia.

Ten teams completed the course. The winner was a Nuna car built by Nuon of the Netherlands.

== Results ==
Rank	Team	Country	Time (hr:mn)	Speed (km/h)
1	Nuna	Netherlands	30:54	97.02
2	Aurora	Australia	32:37	91.90
3	Massachusetts Institute of Technology	United States	32:52	91.20
4	Queen's University	Canada	38:16	78.33
5	Bochum	Germany	40:56	73.24
6	Principia College	United States	41:20	72.53
7	Southern Taiwan University	Taiwan	44:00	68.13
8	SA Consortium	Australia	45:15	66.25
9	Aoyama Gakuin University	Japan	49:26	60.65
10	Aurora/RMIT	Australia	52:36	56.99
