= World Solar Challenge 2011 =

World Solar Challenge

The 2011 World Solar Challenge was a race from Darwin, Northern Territory to Adelaide, South Australia in Australia. 37 vehicles were entered in the race, and the event was won by a car from Tokai University, Tokyo, Japan.

Results:

Rank	Team	Country	Distance (km)	Time (hr:mn)	Speed (km/h)
1	Tokai University	Japan	2998	32:45	91.54
2	Nuon	Netherlands	2998	33:50	88.60
3	University of Michigan	United States	2998	35:33	84.33
4	Ashiya University	Japan	2998	44:57	66.70
5	University of Twente	Netherlands	2998	44:04	66.53
6	University of New South Wales	Australia	2998	48:38	61.65
7	Aurora	Australia	2998	48:45	61.50
8	Istanbul University	Turkey	2765		
9	Apollo	Taiwan	2650		
10	Umicore	Belgium	2636		
11	Stanford University	United States	2547		
12	Nanyang Technological University	Singapore	2454		
13	Team Okinawa	Japan	2408		
14	Sakarya University	Turkey	2263		
15	Massachusetts Institute of Technology	United States	2222		
16	Solar Energy Racers	Switzerland	2221		
17	Qazvin Islamic Azad University	Iran	1891		
18	University of Calgary	Canada	1840		
19	Team Solar Philippines	Philippines	1815		
20	UC Berkeley	United States	1811		
21	Onda Solare	Italy	1751		
22	Universidad de Chile	Chile	1709		
23	Anadolu	Turkey	1675		
24	University of Toronto	Canada	1661		
25	University of Cambridge	UK	1487		
26	Bochum	Germany	1454		
27	ETS	Canada	1415		
28	Principia College	United States	1303		
29	Seraaj	Saudi Arabia	1269		
30	University of Waterloo	Canada	1116		
31	University of Tehran	Iran	1027		
32	Solar Spirit Australia	Australia	801		
33	Durham University	UK	552		
34	Solaris	India	301		
35	UMP	Malaysia	229		
36	Uniten Solar Ranger Team	Malaysia	223		
37	Green Maniac	South Korea	73		
