= Erik Varekamp =

- Born: Erik Julius Varekamp; 1964 (age 61–62) Amsterdam, Netherlands
- Areas: Writer, Artist

Erik Julius Varekamp (Amsterdam June 1964) is a Dutch creator of comic books and illustrations, active for diverse companies and media.

== Biography ==
Varekamp received his education at the Gerrit Rietveld Academie (1984-1988). After he quit this institute he started working for the well-known Dutch cartoonist Gerrit de Jager.

Varekamp had a daily comic in the Dutch newspaper Algemeen Handelsblad called S.O.S. (1986-1988). Two S.O.S books were published.

Together with Mick Peet Varekamp started the Agent Orange series about the life of the Dutch Prince Bernhard of Lippe-Biesterfeld (1911-2004) in 2003, which caught some attention in the headlines of Dutch national media when the first book was launched in 2004, just before the death of the Royal Highness. The comic book is one of the last books that he read. All the volumes (5) of the strip are accompanied by essays with backgrounds and documentation from the Dutch historian Coen Hilbrink.

Varekamp has worked as an illustrator for companies as Liander, Algemeen Dagblad, HP/De Tijd, Daimler (Duitsland), Hard Gras, Albert Heijn and VPRO-gids.

== Bibliography ==
- Varekamp, E. en Peet, M. (2004), Agent Orange, De jonge jaren van Prins Bernhard. Amsterdam: Uitgeverij Van Praag. ISBN 904903201X
- Varekamp, E. en Peet, M. (2005), Het grote Prins Bernhard aankleedboek. Amsterdam: Uitgeverij Van Praag. ISBN 9049032036
- Varekamp, E. en Peet, M. (2006), Agent Orange, Het huwelijk van Prins Bernhard. Amsterdam: Uitgeverij Van Praag. ISBN 978-9049032043
- Varekamp, E. en Peet, M. (2008), Agent Orange, De oorlogsjaren van Prins Bernhard I. Amsterdam: Uitgeverij Van Praag. ISBN 9789049032074
- Varekamp, E. en Peet, M. (2010), Agent Orange, De oorlogsjaren van Prins Bernhard II, De stadhoudersbrief. Amsterdam: Uitgeverij Van Praag. ISBN 9789049032098
- Varekamp, E. en Peet, M. (2012), Agent Orange, De oorlogsjaren van Prins Bernhard III, De affaire Kingkong. Amsterdam: Uitgeverij Van Praag. ISBN 9789049032128
