= World Solar Challenge 2013 =

World Solar Challenge

The 2013 World Solar Challenge was one of a biennial series of solar-powered car races, covering 3,022 km (1,878 mi) through the Australian Outback, from Darwin, Northern Territory to Adelaide, South Australia.

In all, 37 teams competed of which 16 completed the course. There were three classes: Cruiser, Challenge and Adventure. The Cruiser class was won by Eindhoven University of Technology of the Netherlands; the Challenge class by Nuon Solar Team of the Netherlands; and the Adventure class by the Australian Aurora team.

== Results tables ==
=== Cruiser class ===
Rank	Team	Country	Distance (km)	Time (hr:mn)	Person Kilometers	External Energy (kWh)	Practicality (%)	Final Score (%)
1	Eindhoven	Netherlands	3022	40:14	9093	64.0	88.3	97.5
2	Bochum	Germany	3022	41:38	6484	63.5	87.0	93.9
3	Sunswift	Australia	3022	38:35	3022	64.0	70.7	92.3
4	University of Minnesota	United States	3022	51:41	5454	64.0	69.3	79.2
5	Goko HS	Japan	2288				70.7	
6	Apollo	Taiwan	1558				50.3	
7	TAFE SA Solar Spirit	Australia	1469				71.7	
8	University of Calgary	Canada	719				78.0	

=== Challenger class ===
Rank	Team	Country	Distance (km)	Time (hr:mn)	Speed (km/h)
1	Nuon Solar Team	Netherlands	3022	33:03	90.71
2	Tokai University	Japan	3022	36:22	82.43
3	University of Twente	Netherlands	3022	37:38	79.67
4	Stanford University	United States	3022	39:31	75.86
5	Solar Energy Racers	Switzerland	3022	40:13	74.54
6	Punch Powertrain	Belgium	3022	40:28	74.08
7	Team Arrow	Australia	3022	43:38	68.71
8	University of Toronto	Canada	3022	45:38	65.71
9	University of Michigan	United States	3022	45:55	65.29
10	Onda Solare	Italy	3022	48:25	61.92
11	University of Western Sydney	Australia	2891		
12	Kanazawa Institute of Technology	Japan	2564		
13	EAFIT-EPM	Colombia	2505		
14	Kogakuin University	Japan	2450		
15	KUST	South Korea	2013		
16	SunSPEC	Singapore	1676		
17	Istanbul Technical University (İTU)	Turkey	1613		
18	ETS	Canada	1530		
19	Sun Shuttle	China	1398		
20	Jonkoping University	Sweden	1301		
21	ITS	Indonesia	748		
22	UMP	Malaysia	616		

=== Adventure class ===
Rank	Team	Country	Distance (km)	Time (hr:mn)	Speed (km/h)
1	Aurora	Australia	3022	38:39	77.57
2	Antakari	Chile	3022	49:31	60.54
3	Sikat Solar	Philippines	2487		
4	IVE	Hong Kong	2105		
5	KAIT	Japan	1533		
6	Solaris	Turkey	1481		
7	Mississippi Choctaw HS	United States	164		
