= World Solar Challenge 2001 =

Solar-powered car races

The 2001 World Solar Challenge was one of a biennial series of solar-powered car races, covering about 3,000 km (1,900 mi) through the Australian Outback, from Darwin, Northern Territory to Adelaide, South Australia. The winner was a Nuna "Alpha Centauri" car built by Nuon of the Netherlands.

== Results ==
Rank	Car No	Team	Car Name	Class	Country	Date In	Time In	Distance (km)	Total Time (HH:MM)	Avg Speed (km/h)
1	3	Nuna	Nuna	Development	Netherlands	Nov 21	17:09	2997.8	32:39	91.81
2	101	Aurora Vehicle Association	Aurora	Development	Australia	Nov 22	08:43	2997.8	33:13	90.26
3	2	University of Michigan	M-Pulse	Development	United States	Nov 22	09:49	2997.8	34:19	87.37
4	142	University of Missouri-Rolla	SolarMiner III	Development	United States	Nov 22	13:14	2997.8	37:44	79.45
5	100	Queens University	Mirage	Production	Canada	Nov 22	13:43	2997.8	38:13	78.45
6	77	University of Tamagawa(Team A)	White Dolphin	Production	Japan	Nov 22	14:53	2997.8	39:23	76.12
7	10	Lake Tuggeranong College	Spirit of Canberra	Production	Australia	Nov 22	16:07	2997.8	40:37	73.81
8	15	Northern Territory University	Desert Rose	Development	Australia	Nov 22	16:22	2997.8	40:52	73.36
9	33	Kanazawa Institute of Technology	KIT Golden Eagle	Development	Japan	Nov 22	17:03	2997.8	41:33	72.14
10***	4	Solar Motion	SoMo	Development	United States	Nov 23	09:07	2997.8	42:37	70.35
11	52	University of New South Wales	Sunswift II	Development	Australia	Nov 23	10:01	2997.8	43:31	68.89
12	88	University of Tamagawa(Team B)	Dolphin	Production	Japan	Nov 23	10:32	2997.8	44:02	68.08
13	11	Tokai University	Tokai Spirit 2001	Production	Japan	Nov 23	10:51	2997.8	44:21	67.59
14	12	University of Toronto Blue Sky	Faust	Development	Canada	Nov 23	10:56	2997.8	44:26	67.47
15	24	University of Waterloo	Midnight Sun VI	Development	Canada	Nov 23	10:57	2997.8	44:27	67.45
16	41	South Bank University	Mad Dog 3	Production	UK	Nov 23	13:28	2997.8	46:58	63.83
17	55	Ashiya University	Sky-Ace Tiga	Production	Japan	Nov 23	14:49	2997.8	48:19	62.05
18	5	AGU Solar Car Project	AGU Aglaia	Stock	Japan	Nov 23	14:52	2997.8	48:22	61.98
19	67	Tokyo Salesian Polytechnic	Ikuei Neo II	Production	Japan	Nov 23	14:58	2997.8	48:28	61.86
20	59	Helios	Helios 2-001	Development	France	Nov 24	09:18	2997.8	51:48	61.26
21	26	South Australia Solar Car Consortium	Ned	Stock	Australia	Nov 24	10:13	2997.8	52:23	57.23
22	17	Solehada	Solelhada	Stock	France	Nov 24	10:43	2997.8	53:13	56.33
23	51	Mannum Highschool	Christine	Production	Australia	Nov 26	16:17	2997.8	89:17	34.94
24	2001	Team of Kirenjaku	Kirenjaku Mini	Production	Japan	Nov 27	13:27	2531.6		
25	6	Sungroper Solar Car Association	Sungroper	Stock	Australia	Nov 26	17:03	2301.5		
26	13	Kormilda College	Towards Tomorrow	Stock	Australia	Nov 26	11:34	2257.3		
27	4740	Team Ornithorhychus	Ornithorhychus	Stock	Australia	Nov 26	12:35	2063.8		
28	50	Burdekin Highschool	Spirit of Burdekin	Stock	Australia	Nov 26	12:48	2008.6		
29	62	South Australia Solar Car Consortium	Kelly	Production	Australia	Nov 23	15:31	1819.7		
30	7	Vehicle Solaire Neo-Caledonien	Defi Solaire	Production	New Caledonia	Nov 25	12:35	1531.0		
	75	Hutt Valley High School	Hutt Valley	Stock	New Zealand	Withdrawn				
	21	HelioDet	Heliodet 5	Stock	Germany	Withdrawn				
	42	Southern Cross College	Southern Exposure	Stock	Australia	Withdrawn				
		Greenfleet	Honda Insight	Demonstration	Australia			2997.8		
	2500	Biel	Spirit of Biel	Demonstration	Switzerland			2997.9		
	53	Honda Australia	Insight	Demonstration	Australia			2997.9		
	18	Annesley College	EOS Spirit of Unley	Demonstration	Australia			2997.9		
***Solar Motion was originally recorded arriving in 4th place at 12:07 on Nov 22, but was later penalized
