= Mitsuba Corporation =

Japanese automobile components manufacturing company

MITSUBA Corporation
- Type: Public KK
- Traded as: TYO: 7280
- Industry: Automotive
- Founded: (March 8, 1946; 80 years ago)
- Headquarters: 1-2681 Hirosawa-cho, Kiryū, Gunma 376-8555, Japan
- Key people: Noboru Hino (Chairman and CEO); Yuichi Nagase (President and COO)
- Products: Car electrical components; Motorcycle components; Nursing care equipment; Solar car & EV products
- Revenue: ▲US$ 2.64 billion (FY 2013) (¥ 272.54 billion) (FY 2013)
- Net income: ▲US$ 68.28 million (FY 2013) (¥ 7.02 billion) (FY 2013)
- Number of employees: 19,555 (consolidated, as of March 31, 2014)
- Website: Official website

MITSUBA Corporation (株式会社ミツバ, Kabushiki-gaisha MITSUBA) or simply MITSUBA, is a Japanese manufacturer of automobile parts including electrical components for wiper systems, door mirrors, power window motors, fuel pumps, and pressure regulators.

Mitsuba is listed on the Tokyo Stock Exchange and as of March 2014, comprises 47 companies.

The company was involved in development of Tokai Challenger project, a solar car built by Tokai University. Mitsuba manufactured the car's brushless DC direct drive motor.

== History ==
- 1946 - Mitsuba Electric Mfg. Co., Ltd. was founded in Kiryu, Gunma Prefecture. Production and sale of generator lamps for bicycles began.
- 1951 - Production and sale of auto horns began as the first auto related business.
- 1956 - Production and sale of wiper motors began.
- 1960 - Production and sale of starters for small motorcycles began.
- 1970 - Ryomo Computing Center Co., Ltd. was founded. (Renamed to Ryomo Systems Co., Ltd. in 1982)
- 1977 - Initial public offering on the Tokyo Stock Exchange.
- 1987 - American Mitsuba Corporation was founded in Mount Pleasant, Michigan
- 1988 - Mitsuba shares were listed on the Second Section of the Tokyo Stock Exchange.
- 1989 - Listing of Mitsuba shares was changed to the First Section of the Tokyo Stock Exchange.
- 1996 - Business name was changed to Mitsuba Corporation.

Established the first European production base for automobile components in France

- 1997 - Mitsuba announced the New Mitsuba Environmental Declaration and Guidelines for Action.
- 2006 - MITSUBA WAY was established.
- 2007 - The Jidosha Denki Kogyo Co., Ltd. (Jideco) merged with Mitsuba.

== Business segments and products ==
=== Auto Electrical Products ===
- Field-of-vision system
  - Front wiper systems
  - Rear wiper systems
  - Windshield washer systems
  - Door mirrors
  - Lamps
- Convenience and comfort system
  - Power window motors
  - Power seat motors
  - Sunroof motors
  - Power slide door systems
  - Winch system
  - Door lock actuators
  - Fuel tank lid openers
  - Relays
  - Horns
- Engine auxiliary module
  - Starter motors
  - Fan motors
  - Intelligent dynamic actuators
- Drive control system
  - Electronic throttle control motors
  - Electric power steering motors
  - Active force pedal actuators
  - Electric servo brake motors

=== Motorcycle Electrical Products ===
- Starter motors
- AC generators
- ACG starters
- Fuel pump modules
- General, starter and flasher relays
- Actuators
- Horns

=== Nursing Care Products ===
- Linear actuators
- Linear actuator controls and switches

=== Solarcar & EV Products ===
- Solar Car Products
- Motors for small EV
- Motors for electric racing carts
- Driving motors for small electric vehicles

=== General Use Products ===
- General-purpose motors
- Bicycle lighting systems

== See also ==
- Tokai Challenger, a solar car equipped with Mitsuba electric motor
