= World Solar Challenge 2009 =

Solar-powered car races

The 2009 World Solar Challenge was one of a biennial series of solar-powered car races, covering 3,021 km (1,877 mi) through the Australian Outback, from Darwin, Northern Territory to Adelaide, South Australia.

In the Challenge class 24 teams started, of which eight completed the course, and the winner was Tokai University of Japan. In the Adventure class seven teams started and two completed the course, the winner being Osaka Sangyo University also of Japan.

== Challenge class ==
Rank	Team	Country	Distance (km)	Time (hr:mn)	Speed (km/h)
1	Tokai University	Japan	3021	29:49	100.54
2	Nuon	Netherlands	3021	32:38	91.88
3	University of Michigan	United States	3021	33:08	90.49
4	University of New South Wales	Australia	3021	39:18	76.28
5	Massachusetts Institute of Technology	United States	3021	40:41	73.70
6	Aurora	Australia	3021	42:20	70.82
7	Principia College	United States	3021	43:23	69.11
8	University of Twente	Netherlands	3021	44:53	66.80
9	Bochum Solar World 1	Germany	2896		
10	Stanford University	United States	2719		
11	Nanyang Technological University	Singapore	1953		
12	Bochum Bo Cruiser	Germany	1850		
13	Belenos	France	1645		
14	University of Cambridge	UK	1616		
15	Sakarya University	Turkey	1437		
16	Istanbul University	Turkey	1380		
17	Heliox	Switzerland	1042		
18	Leeming HS	Australia	950		
19	Willetton HS	Australia	906		
20	Umicore	Belgium	380		
21	Polytechnique Montreal	Canada	287		
22	Uniten Solar Ranger Team	Malaysia	250		
23	McMaster University	Canada	146		
24	ETS	Canada	96		

== Adventure class ==
Rank	Team	Country	Distance (km)	Time (hr:mn)	Speed (km/h)
1	Osaka Sangyo University	Japan	3021	34:45	86.27
2	Southern Aurora	Australia	3021	44:17	67.71
3	Goko HS	Japan	2719		61.77 (Note: Tiebreaker)
4	Helios	France	2719		58.31
5	SolarShop Kelly	Australia	2217		
6	Towards Tomorrow	Australia	1156		
7	CPDM	Malaysia	514		
