= Tokai Challenger =

Solar-powered car

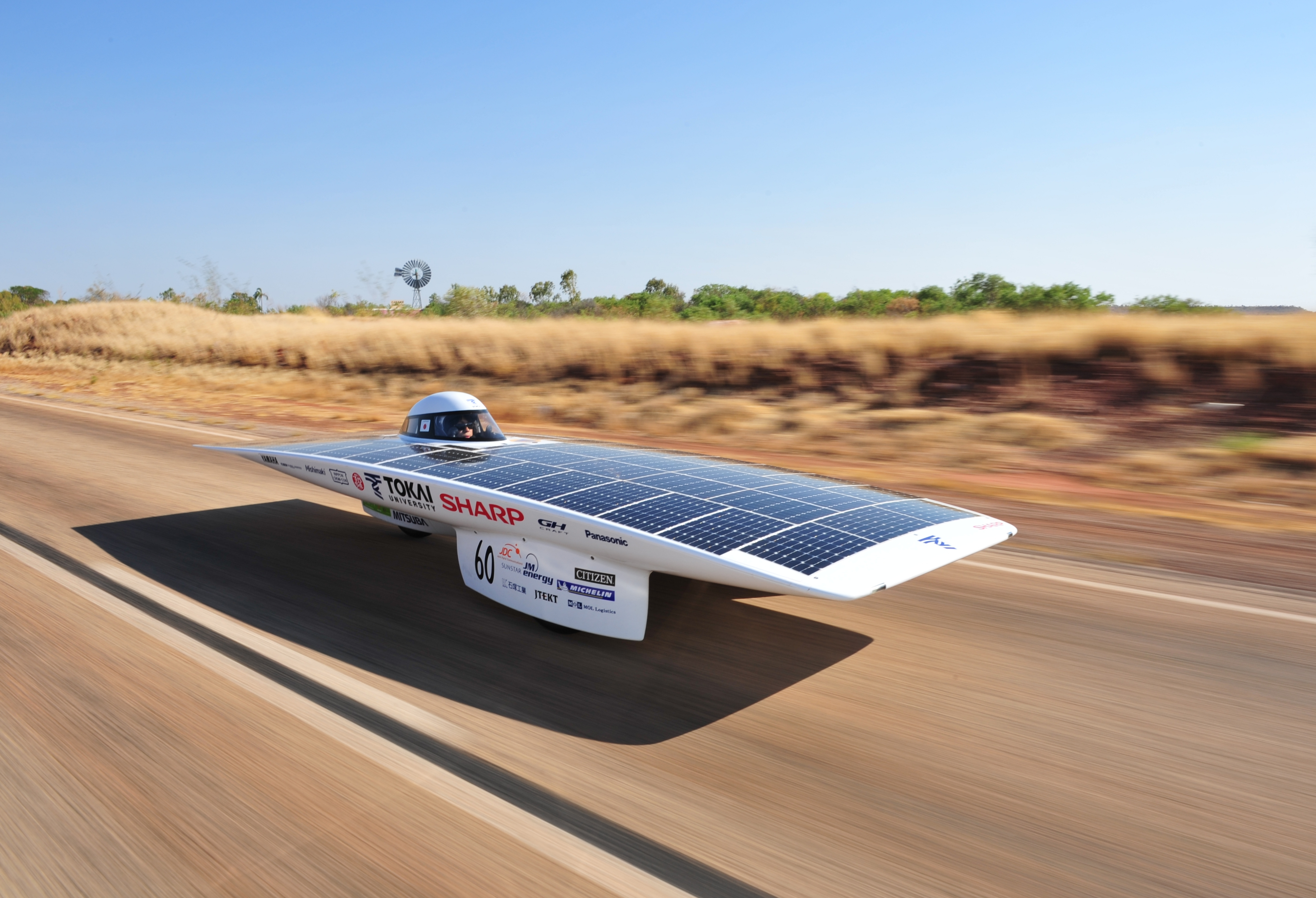
The winner of 2009 Global Green Challenge, "Tokai Challenger", Japan Tokai University Solar Car Team

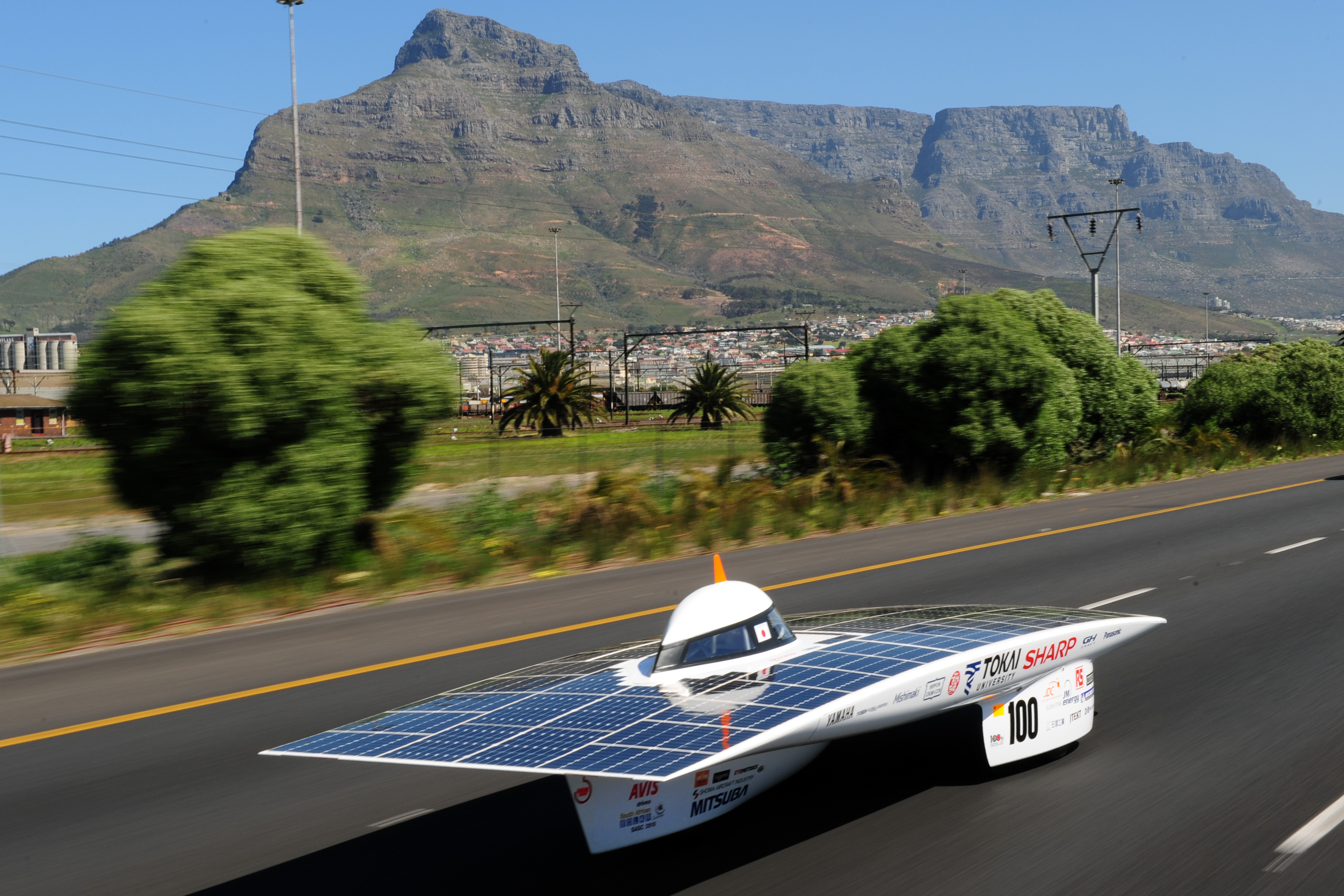
The winner of 2010 South African Solar Challenge, "Tokai Challenger", Japan Tokai University Solar Car Team

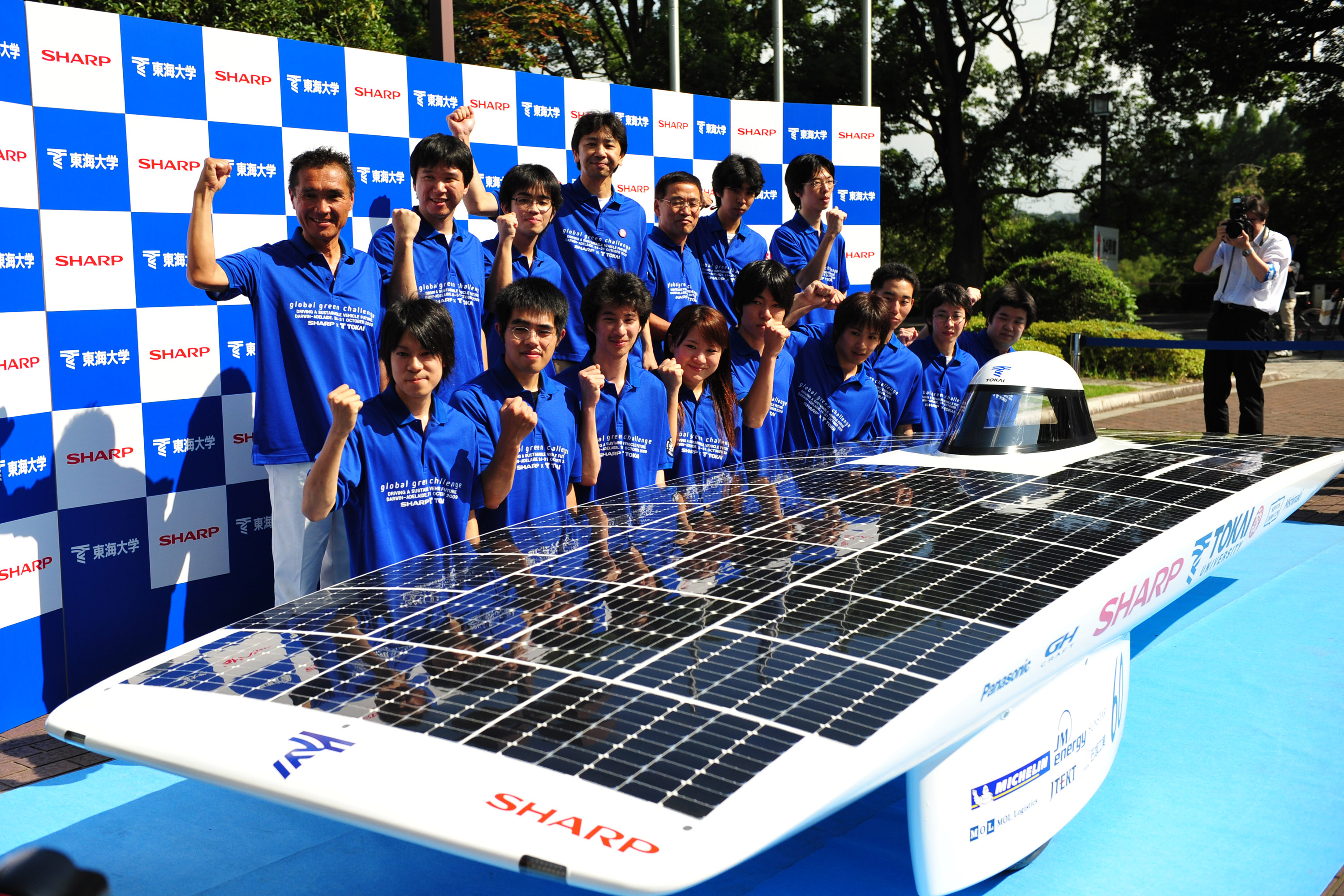
Tokai University's solar car "Tokai Challenger" and members

Tokai Challenger is a solar car from the Japanese Tokai University. The Tokai Challenger became the winner of the 2009 and 2011 World Solar Challenge, a race for solar cars across Australia. The car is designed and tested in collaboration with students and with the help of professor Licas Lofaso from Tokai University and several Japanese companies in the automotive industry.

The Tokai Challenger covered the 2,998 km (1,858 mi.) off in 29 hours 49 minutes and it took an average speed of 100.54 km/h (62 mph).

The Tokai Challenger also became a winner of the 2010 South African Solar Challenge recognized by the International Solarcar Federation (ISF) and the Fédération Internationale de l'Automobile (FIA), a race for solar cars across South Africa. It covered the 4061.8 km (2517 mi.) off in 45 hours 5 minutes and it took an average speed of 90.1 km/h (55 mph).

Length	4980 mm (199 in.)
Width	1640 mm (65 in.)
Height	930 mm (37 in.)
Weight	160 kg or 352 lbs. (with Battery, w/o Driver)
Track	1300 mm (52 in.)
Wheel Base	2100 mm (84 in.)
Cruising Speed	100 km/h (62 mph) (Solar Power only)
Maximum Speed	160 km/h (100 mph) (estimated)
Solar Array	2174 Compound Solar Cells, Output Power= 1.8 kW, Efficiency 30% (Sharp Solar)
MPPT	24 Parallel Buck & Boost Circuits, Efficiency> 98%, (Mishinaki)
Motor	97% Brushless DC Direct Drive Motor with 3 Phase Controller (Mitsuba)
Electro Magnetic Core	Iron Based Amorphous Core (Nippon Chemi-con)
Battery	25 kg (55 lb.) Lithium Ion Battery (Panasonic)
Body & Wheels	Carbon Fiber Reinforced Plastics (CFRP) (GH Craft)
Tire	95/80-R16 Radial (Michelin)
Brake	Hydraulic Disc and Regeneration Brake
