= South African Solar Challenge =

Bi-annual South African event that is to be held for the first time in 2008

- Venue: Public roads
- Location: South Africa
- Corporate sponsor: Sasol
- First race: 2008
- Last race: 2026
- Distance: ~2500km
- Most wins (team): Nuna

The Sasol Solar Challenge is a South African endurance challenge for solar-powered vehicles, with classes for hybrid vehicles, electric vehicles, and biofuel-powered vehicles as well. Recognised by the International Solarcar Federation, the first challenge was run in 2008, and every two years thereafter. The event covers roughly 2,500 km, but has set loops for teams to repeat, with the potential to do 5,000 km. The current record, held by Dutch team Nuon, is 4,716 km, set in 2016 in their car Nuna. The challenge route may change from year to year. In 2022, it ran from Carnival City near Johannesburg to Cape Town over the course of 8 days. The challenge has both local South African teams from both high schools and universities participate, as well as some top-ranking international teams from Japan (Tokai), Belgium (Innoptus Solar Team previously known as Agoria) and the Netherlands (Brunel Solar Team previously known as Vattenfall/Nuon).

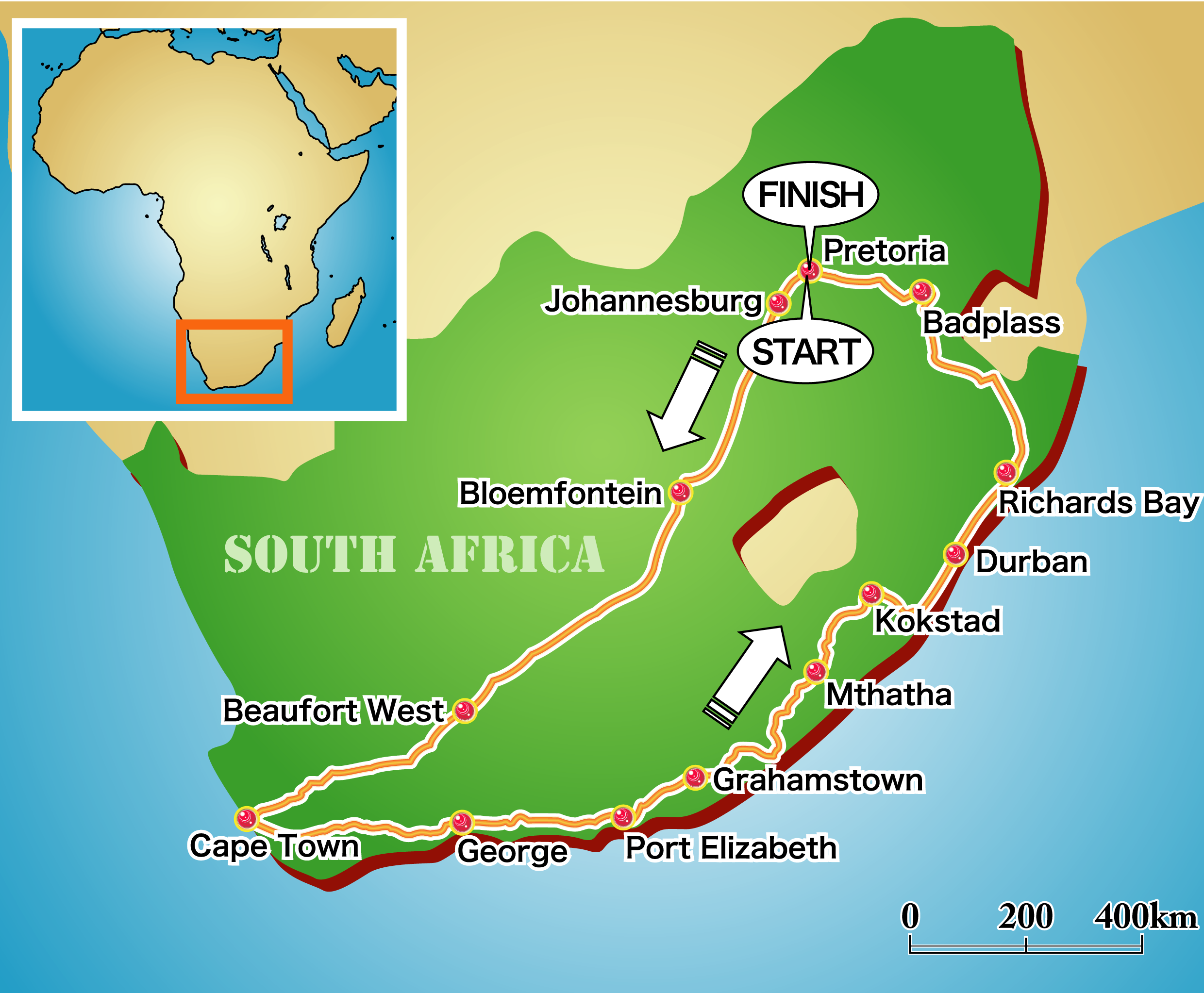
Route Map of "Sasol Solar Challenge 2010"

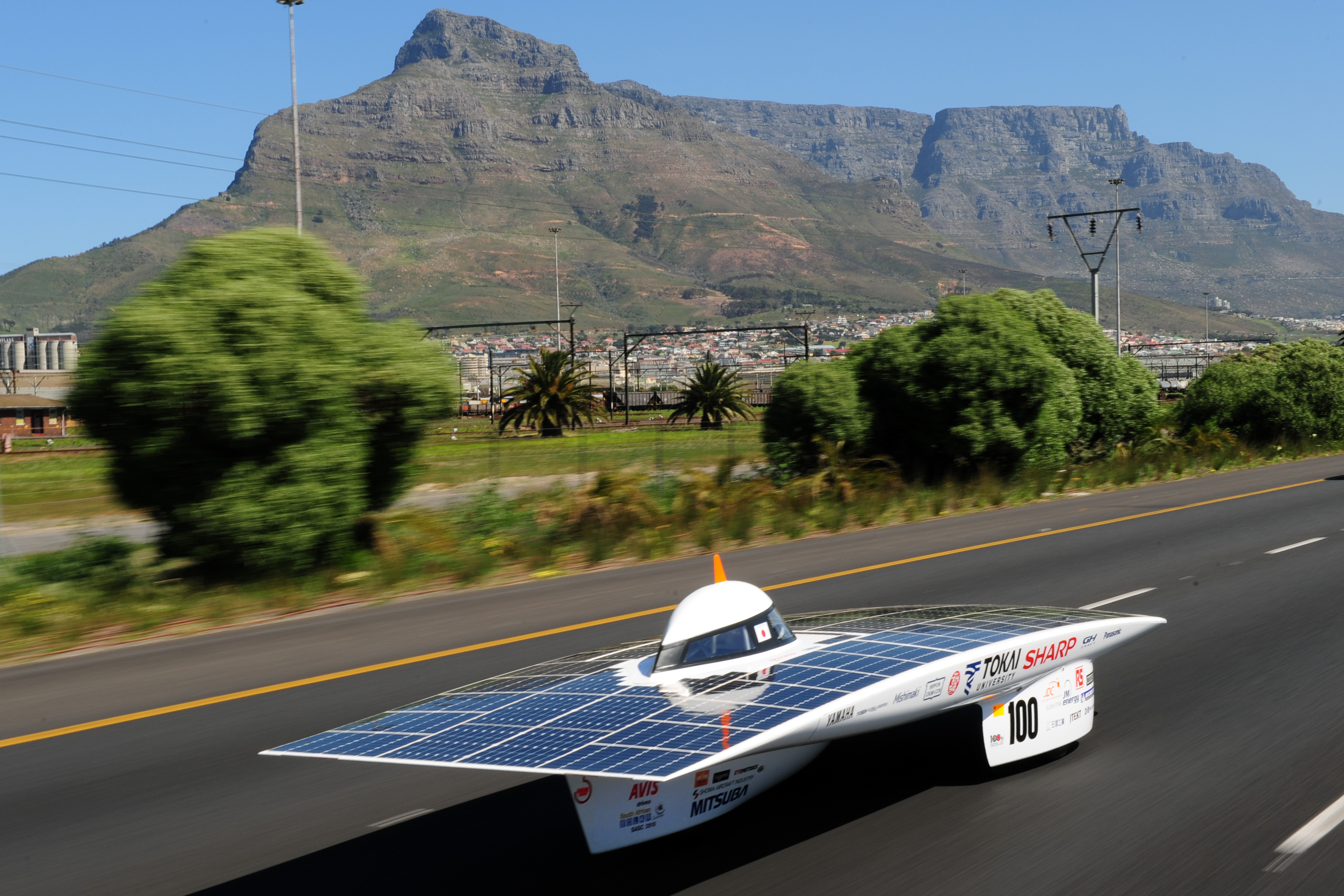
Tokai University's solar car "Tokai Challenger" running in front of the Table Mountain in Cape Town. It became a winner of "South African Solar Challenge 2010" again.

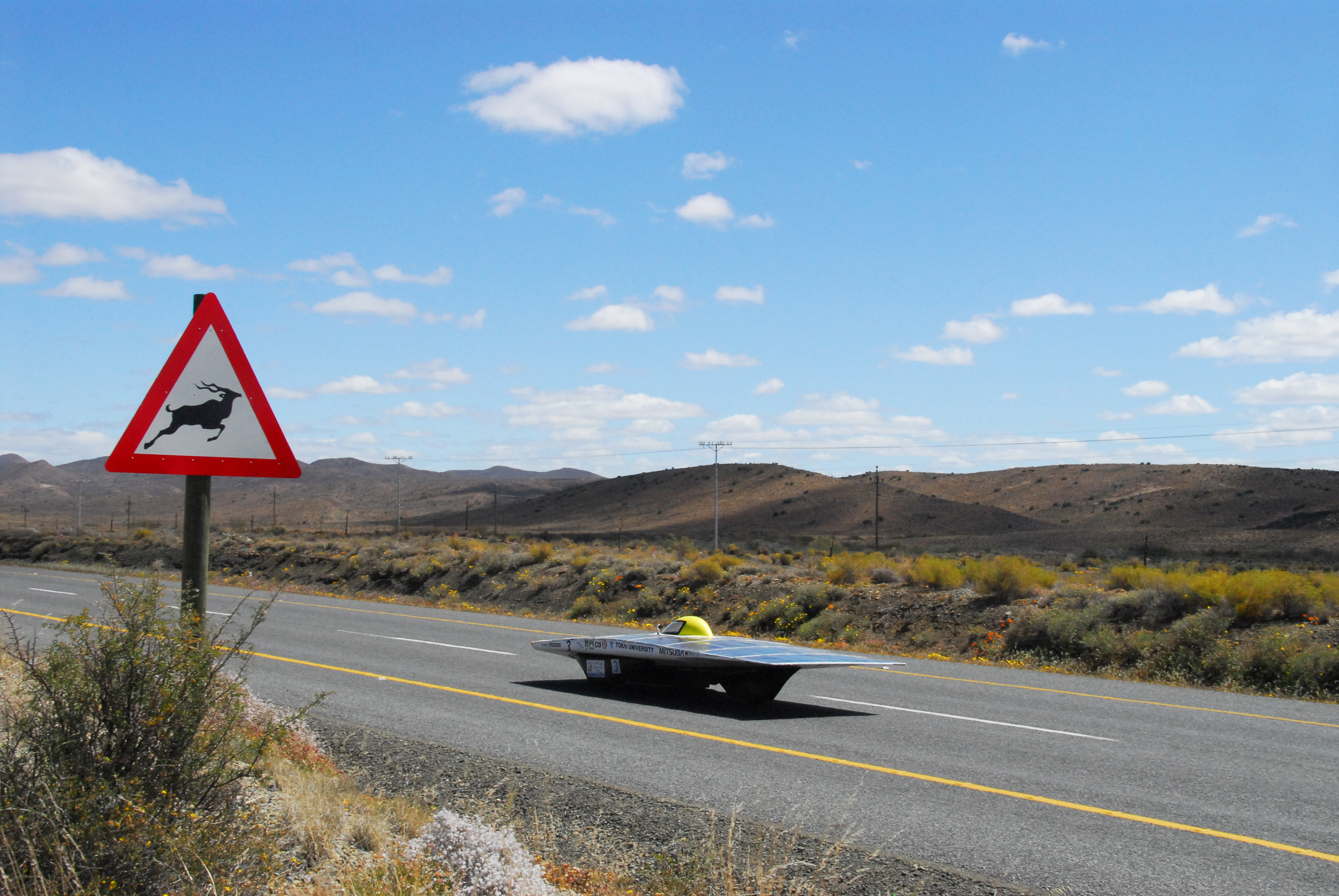
CAUTION-IMPALA! (3rd day of SASC 2008)

== Objective ==
The primary objective is to design, manage, build and race solar-powered vehicles across South Africa. The challenge sees a collaboration between pupils, students, private individuals and various industry and government partners, to work together to have a safe, technology-rich event. Moreover, the challenge is seen as an educational tool to focus on and communicate about science and technology to the broad public.

== Results ==
=== 2022 edition ===
The Dutch Brunel Solar Team finished first, the Belgian Innoptus Solar Team which participated for the first time became second with 38km difference and bronze went to Sunchaser, from South African university TUT.

Winners
Year	Team	Country
2008	Tokai University	Japan
2010	Tokai University	Japan
2012	Tokai University	Japan
2014	Delft University	Netherlands
2016	Delft University	Netherlands
2018	Delft University	Netherlands
2022	Delft University	Netherlands
2024	Innoptus	Belgium

== Gallery ==
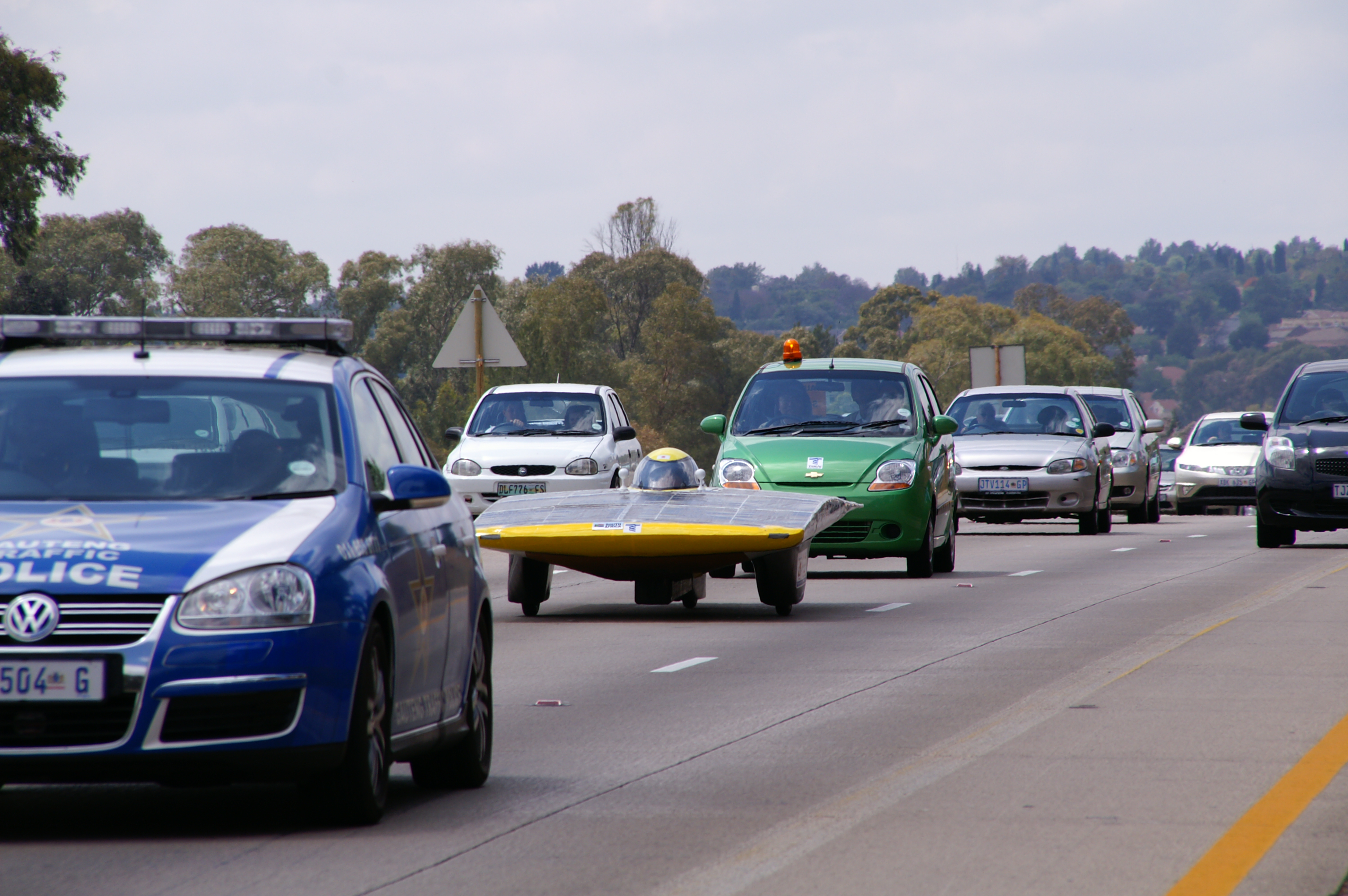
Tokai University's solar car "Tokai Falcon". The winner of "South African Solar Challenge 2008".

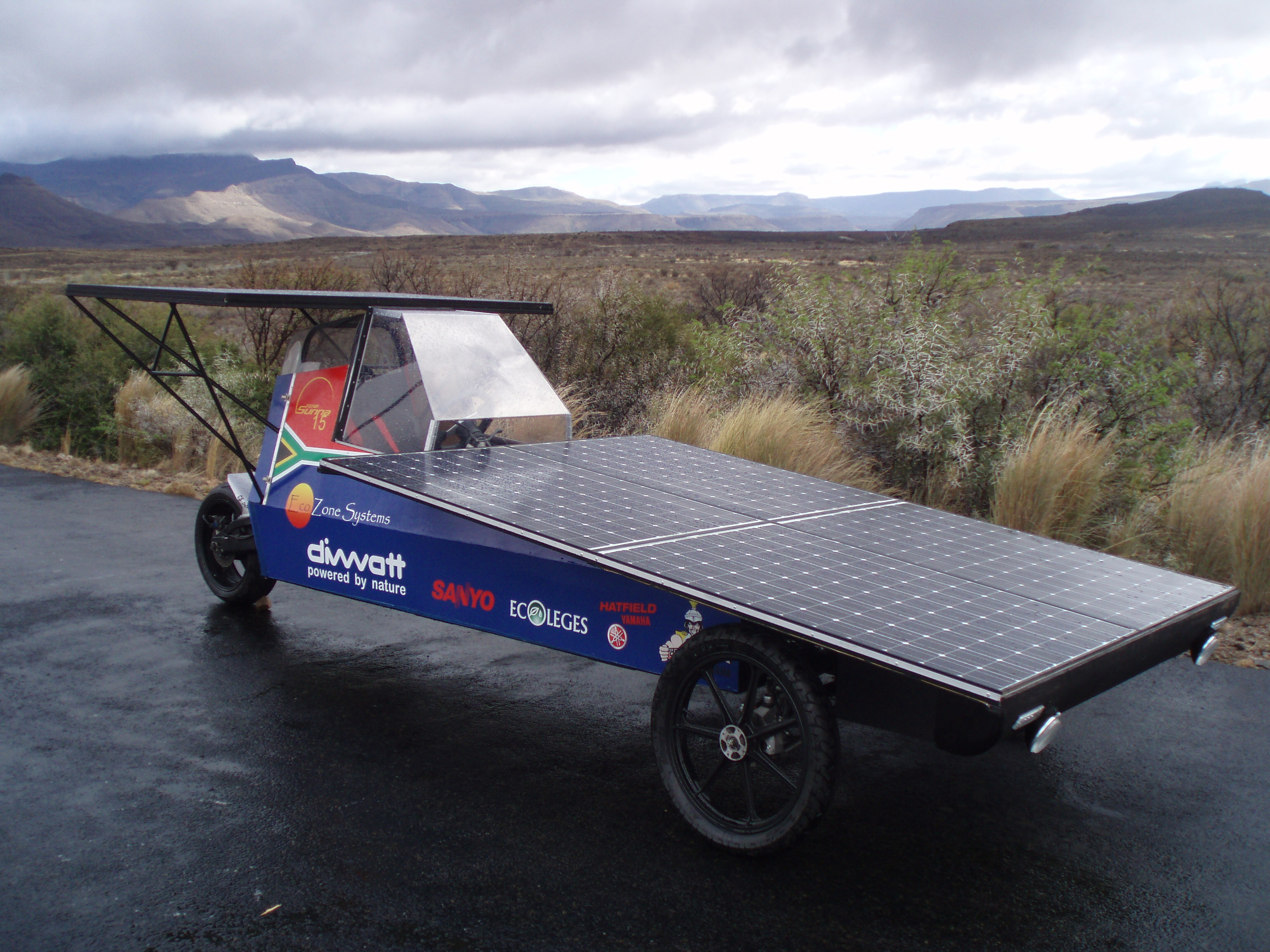
Sunna car in the Karoo National Park

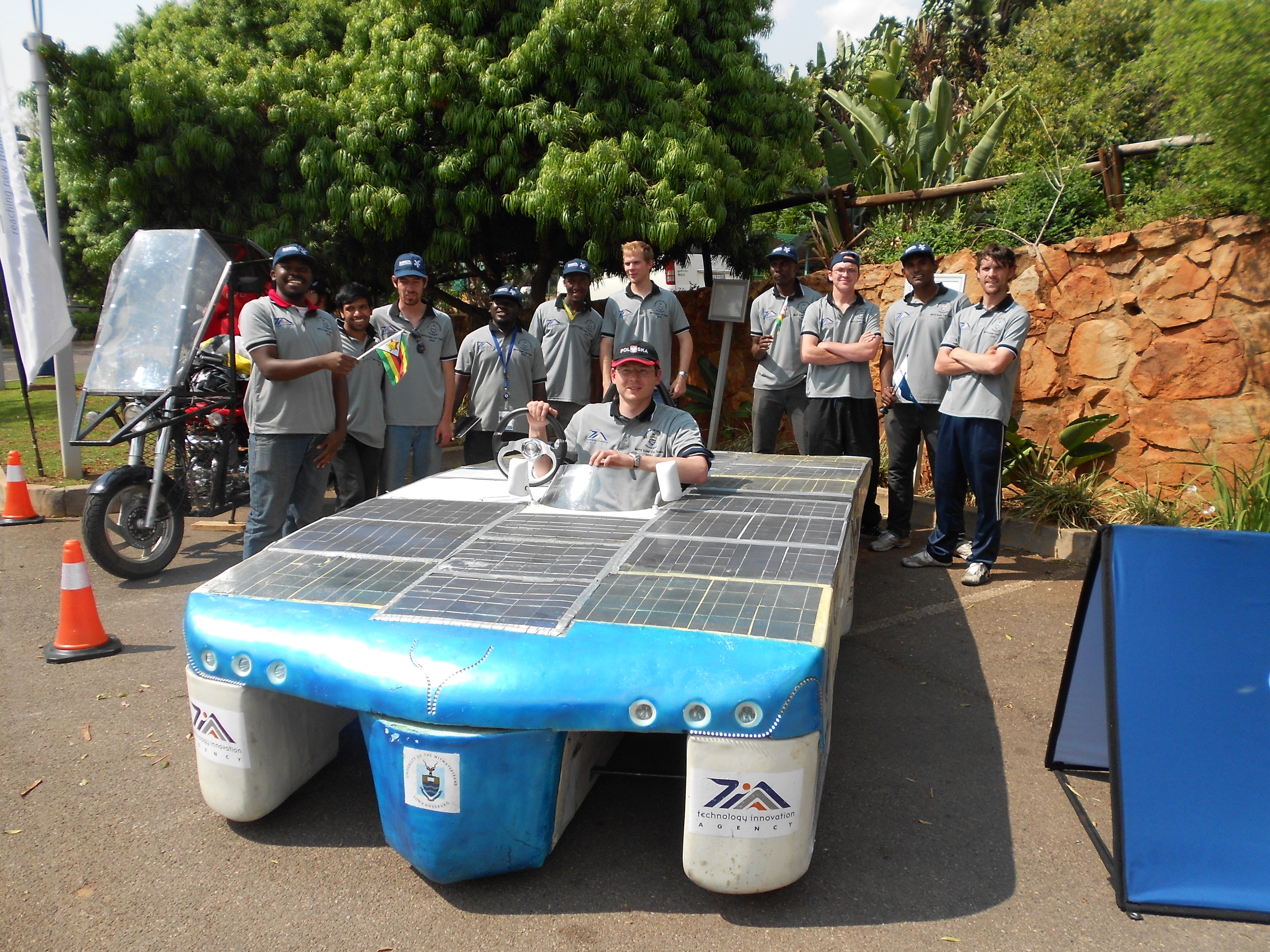
WSS-1 (Wits Super Solar 1), the first generation Wits University entry

== See also ==
- North American Solar Challenge
- Race The Sun
- World Solar Challenge
- Hunt-Winston School Solar Car Challenge
- The Quiet Achiever, the world's first solar-powered race car
