= Liander =

Utility company in the Netherlands

Liander N.V.
- Type: Naamloze vennootschap
- Industry: Electric utility
- Founded: 2008
- Headquarters: Arnhem, Netherlands
- Products: Natural gas sale and distribution, electricity distribution
- Website: www.liander.nl

Liander is a Dutch utility company which operates in the distribution of electricity and natural gas in part of the Netherlands. Liander NV is the largest utility company in the Netherlands, managing the energy network in the provinces of Gelderland and North Holland entirely, and in large parts of Flevoland, Friesland and South Holland.

Liander NV was formerly known as Continuon, and is now a division of the umbrella-company Alliander. Alliander includes also Liandon (formerly Nuon Tecno), focused on building and maintenance of large energy infrastructures, and Lyandin (formerly Dynamicom) that operates in lighting of public spaces.

Liander was split from the Nuon group in July 2008 and since 12 November 2008 it has operated under the new name Liander. Nuon continues to operate as a production and supply company, under the name Nuon Energy.
