= Ashiya University =

Coordinates: 34°45′10″N 135°18′25.7″E

- 芦屋大学
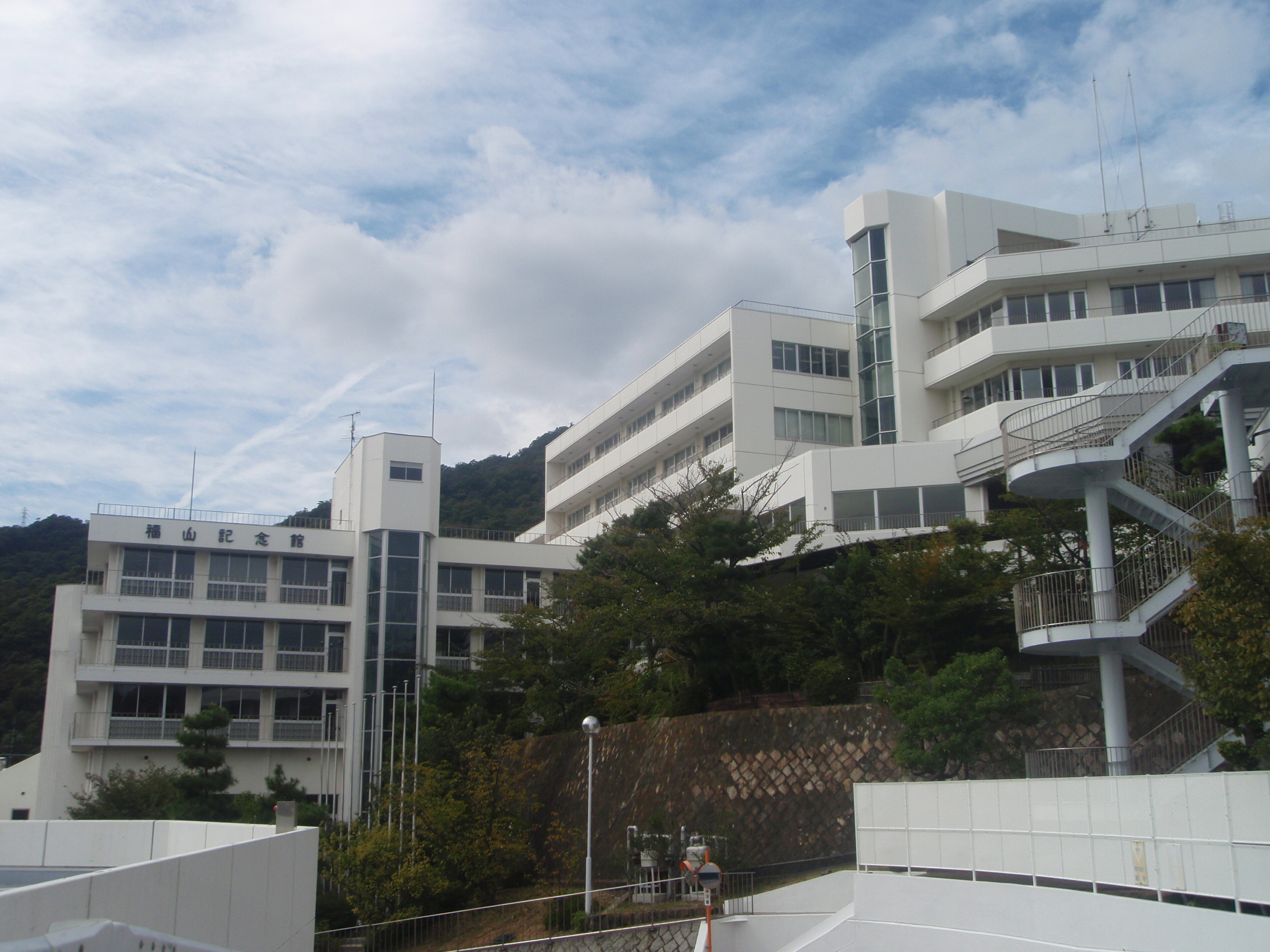
- Type: Private
- Established: 1964
- Location: Ashiya, Hyōgo, Japan
- Website: Official website

Ashiya University (芦屋大学, Ashiya daigaku) is a private university in Ashiya, Hyōgo, Japan, founded in 1964.
