= Vattenfall Nederland =

Utility company in the Netherlands

Vattenfall Nederland B.V.
- Company type: Subsidiary
- Industry: Electricity
- Predecessor: Provinciale Gelderse Energie Maatschappij (PGEM); Provinciaal Elektriciteitsbedrijf Friesland (PEB Friesland); Zuid-Gelderse Nutsbedrijven (ZGN); Veluwse Nutsbedrijven (VNB); Energie Noord-West; Gamog; Energie- en Watervoorziening Rijnland
- Headquarters: Amsterdam, Netherlands
- Area served: Netherlands
- Key people: Peter Smink (CEO Nuon) Magnus Hall (CEO Vattenfall) Ingrid Bonde (CFO) Claes Wallnér (CIO)
- Products: Electrical power Natural gas Heat
- Number of employees: 6,000
- Parent: Vattenfall
- Website: vattenfall.nl

Vattenfall Nederland B.V. (former name: N.V. Nuon Energy) is a utility company based in Amsterdam, Netherlands. It provides electricity, natural gas, and heat. The company belongs to the group of Vattenfall.

== History ==
Nuon NV was established in 1994 by a merger of regional utility companies Provinciale Gelderse Energie Maatschappij (PGEM), Provinciaal Elektriciteitsbedrijf Friesland (PEB Friesland), Zuid-Gelderse Nutsbedrijven (ZGN) and Veluwse Nutsbedrijven (VNB). The new company adopted the name N.V. Nuon Energie-Onderneming. The name Nuon was a Dutch abbreviation for utility (NU) and for east (O) and north (N), which were that time the main markets for the company. The yellow and purple logo and car design was also introduced during this time. In 1999 also Energie Noord-West, Gamog and Energie- en Watervoorziening Rijnland were merged with Nuon and the name was changed N.V. Nuon.

Installation company Feenstra was taken over on 1 December 2000. Feenstra's new construction unit was sold to Groen Holding in 2012 and the insulation unit to De Takkenkamp Groep in 2016

In 2000, Nuon incorporated Nuon Renewables in the United Kingdom. In 2012, Nuon Renewables was merged with Vattenfall's renewable energy operations in the United Kingdom and it became Vattenfall United Kingdom. Since 2001, Nuon has sponsored the student team at the World Solar Challenge. In 2002, Nuon expanded into Germany and Belgium.

In 2003, Nuon acquired Reliant Energy Europe, formerly Energieproduktiebedrijf UNA, a subsidiary of the American utility Reliant Energy operating in Amsterdam and Utrecht.

On 1 February 2007, Nuon and another Dutch energy utility Essent announced their intention to merge. On 7 September 2007, Nuon and Essent announced that the merger was canceled because no agreement could be reached on the exchange ratio.

According to the Independent Network Management Act of 2006. the electricity distribution operations were separated into a separate company under the name Liander in November 2008, and in June 2009 Liander was unbundled from Nuon. Correspondingly, Nuon adopted a new name N.V. Nuon Energy.

In 2006, Nuon in the partnership with Royal Dutch Shell built NoordzeeWind (Egmond aan Zee) offshore wind farm. In 2008, Nuon bought stakes in 35 North Sea gas fields from ConocoPhillips. In 2011, the North Sea exploration and production operations were sold to Tullow Oil.

On 1 July 2009, Vattenfall acquired a 49% stake in Nuon and took full control of the company in 2012. Vattenfall is owned by the Swedish state, and the Reinfeldt cabinet was heavily criticized after the company was depreciated by SEK 15 billion post-purchase. The purchase was the biggest business deal in Swedish history.

Nuon's German subsidiary Nuon Deutschland GmbH was sold to Südwestfalen Energie und Wasser AG (ENERVIE AG) in 2010. On 26 July 2011, all activities in Belgium, including the subsidiaries Nuon Wind Belgium and Nuon Power Generation Walloon, were sold to the Italian energy company Eni.

In 2018, the company changed its name to Vattenfall Nederland.

== Operations ==
Vattenfall Nederland produces, sells and delivers electricity, gas, heat and additional services. It owns gas-fired power plants in Amsterdam, Velsen and Diemen,
