= Stella (solar vehicles) =

Solar-powered family car

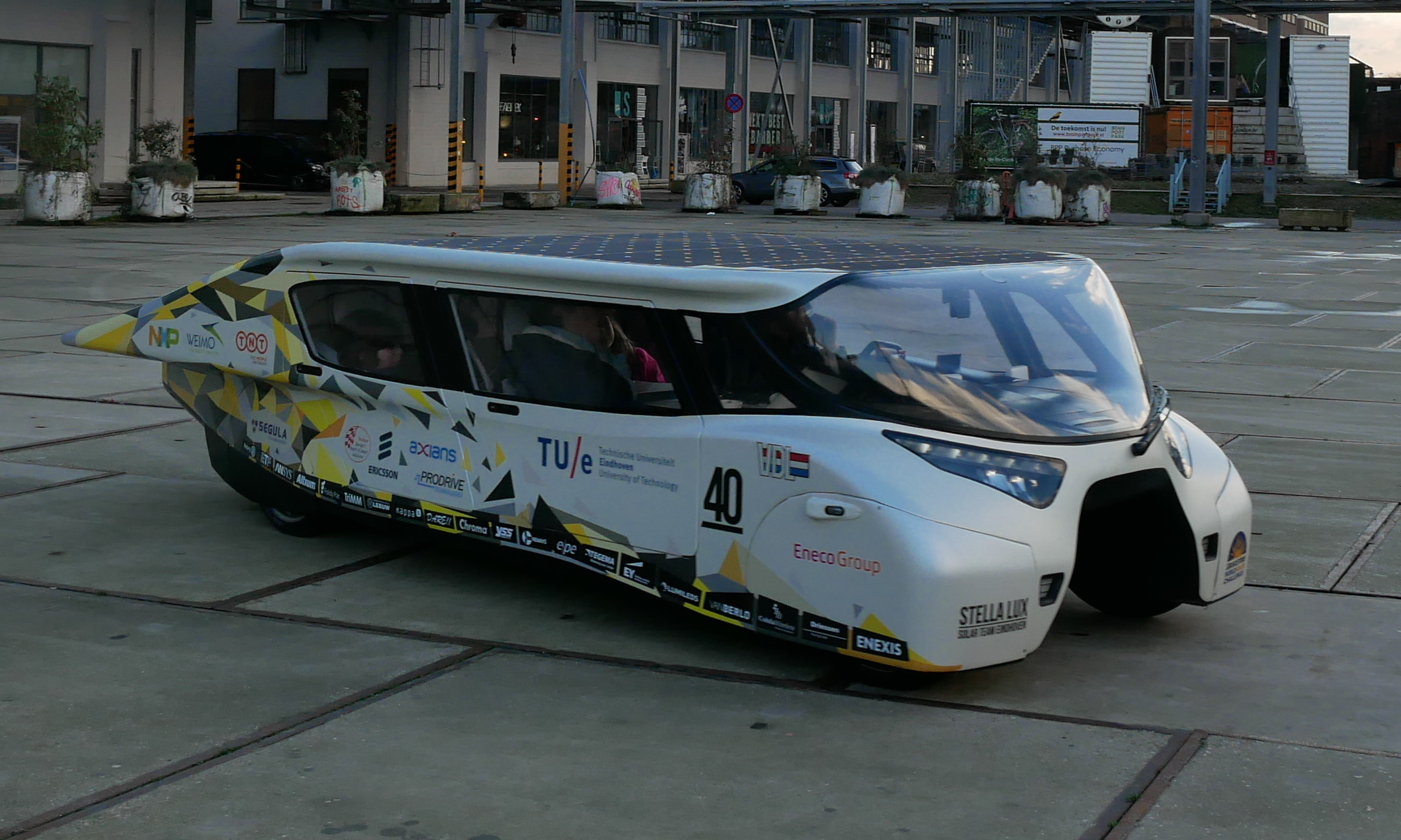
Stella Lux (2015 evolution) solar-powered family car prototype.

Stella and its successors Stella Lux, Stella Vie and Stella Era are a series of solar racing family cars, built for the World Solar Challenge in Australia, sofar winning its Cruiser Class all four times it was held – in 2013, 2015, 2017 and in 2019. Stella is considered the world’s first solar-powered family car and was given the 'Best Technology Development' Award at the 8th annual Crunchies in San Francisco in 2015. Being the only competing vehicle with a license plate, the road registration of Stella contributed to the winning score in the races. The vehicles are designed and built by "Solar Team Eindhoven" (STE) — some 26 students of different faculties of the Eindhoven University of Technology (TU/e) in the Netherlands. The group have set up a non-profit foundation to promote their concepts for practical solar vehicles for adoption on a broader scale.

Contrary to previous solar vehicle race classes that focus primarily on speed, and are contested by highly impractical single-seat racers, a new competition for more "practical" solar electrical vehicles was added to the 2013 edition of the World Solar Challenge (WSC): the Cruiser Class. Vehicles competing carry two or more occupants, each facing forwards, and are judged not only on the time taken to complete the course, but also on their external energy use, payload carried, and an overall practicality assessment.

For this competition a student team from TU Eindhoven created Stella, a solar powered "family car" with four seats and luggage space, which won the WSC's Cruiser Class in 2013. The car is capable of a top speed of 120 kilometres per hour (75 mph) with a full load of four people, using mainstream solar cell technology.
In 2015 Solar Team Eindhoven repeated this achievement with an improved version of the car, called Stella Lux. In 2017 they built a five-seat successor called Stella Vie, with which they won the year's edition of the WSC again.

In 2017, some of the students responsible for the vehicles have launched their own startup company to make a commercially viable version of the car, called Lightyear One. They are hoping to start with a first small production run of 10 “Signature” cars in 2019 and then produce 100 more in 2020. The car is projected to cost at least €120,000 excluding VAT or sales tax, but will offer four-wheel drive for optimal traction.

== Stella ==
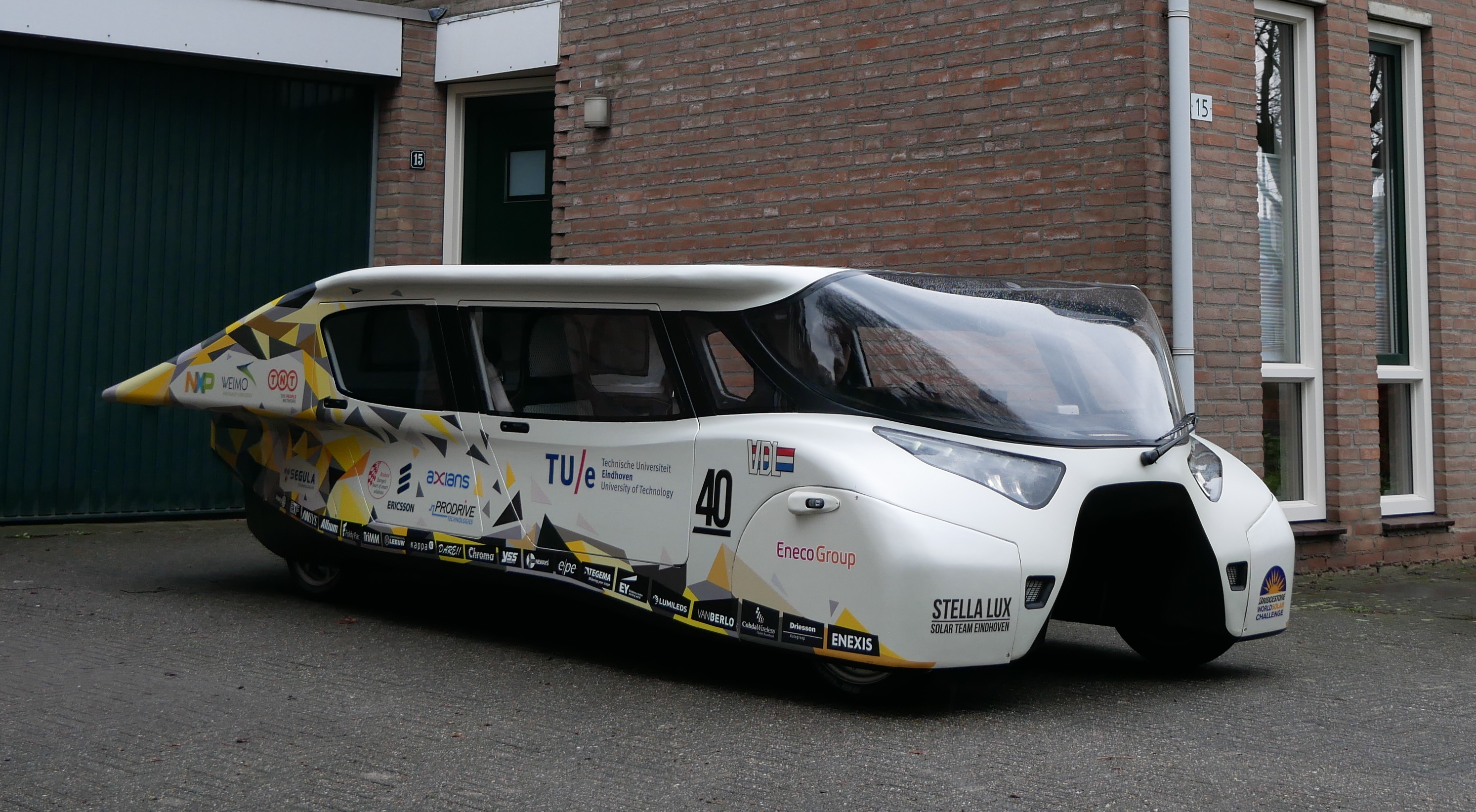
Stella mk. I (2013) and mk. II ('Stella Lux', 2015) look very similar, but the Stella Lux (pictured) features a raised floor in between the left and right seats, to reduce aerodynamic frontal area.

Stella won the inaugural edition of the new for 2013, Michelin-sponsored Cruiser Class of the WSC, completing the 3,022 kilometres (1,878 mi) race distance in 40 hours and 14 minutes, at an average speed of 75 kilometres per hour (47 mph), while typically carrying three occupants, for a total of 9,093 occupant kilometres (5,651 passenger miles).

Vehicles in the WSC's Cruiser class are allowed a small battery-pack which can be plugged in to the power mains for additional charging. Although Stella was mostly relying on its 1.5 kilowatt solar array, the team did use their maximum allowance of 64.0 kWh of external charging during the race. For comparison: according to the EPA, one gallon of gasoline is equivalent to 33.7 kWh. So, effectively, each top-up of the 15.0 kWh lithium-ion battery gives the car about 0.44 gallons of gas, and for the entire 3,022 kilometres (1,878 mi) race distance, the total external energy consumption was equal to less than two gallons of gas. On average, the car's solar array is able to generate more energy than would be consumed by normal daily commuting for most people, and if the car were plugged into the electrical grid, or to an owners house, when parked, it could contribute more energy than it would need to take out, making the car energy positive.

According to the developers, "in real-world conditions, the Stella's large solar array would be able to charge the car's 15 kWh battery pack in 30 to 45 minutes of being parked, sitting in traffic, or tooling around town at low speed". During highway driving, the battery must augment the solar power, and range ends at 600 to 800 kilometres, but urban driving at up to 70 km/h (43 mph) can be sustained entirely on solar power, running solely off the energy generated by the solar panels. After collecting numbers from the Dutch National Statistics Centre, it was calculated that for 10 months of the year, the car would produce more energy than it uses, allowing for twice the distance Dutch people drive on an average day, and assuming Dutch cloudy light conditions.

The Stella is a very boxy, but low-built car. With only 1.15 metres (45 in) height, and its two large doors opening upwards, it is as tricky to get in and out of as a super-sportscar. However, once inside, reviewers found it surprisingly comfortable. The whole of the top of the car is covered in solar panels, and the rear slopes down to create a teardrop shape to reduce air resistance. The car weighs only 388 kilograms (855 lb) thanks to being constructed largely out of carbon-fiber, reinforced by welded aluminium tubing.

Stella is not only road-legal in Europe, having been deemed safe and approved for use on public roads by the Netherlands Road Vehicle Service (RDW) — the Eindhoven team were also able to put a California license-plate on the car for a demonstration run from Los Angeles to San Francisco in 2014. Stella's publicly accessible road registration information lists a cost price of €1,272,327.

One of Solar Team Eindhoven's sponsors, NXP Semiconductors, contributed to the vehicle's electronics, with a concept to make roads safer and reduce air pollution by means of proactive communication between cars, as well as with traffic signals.

== Stella Lux ==
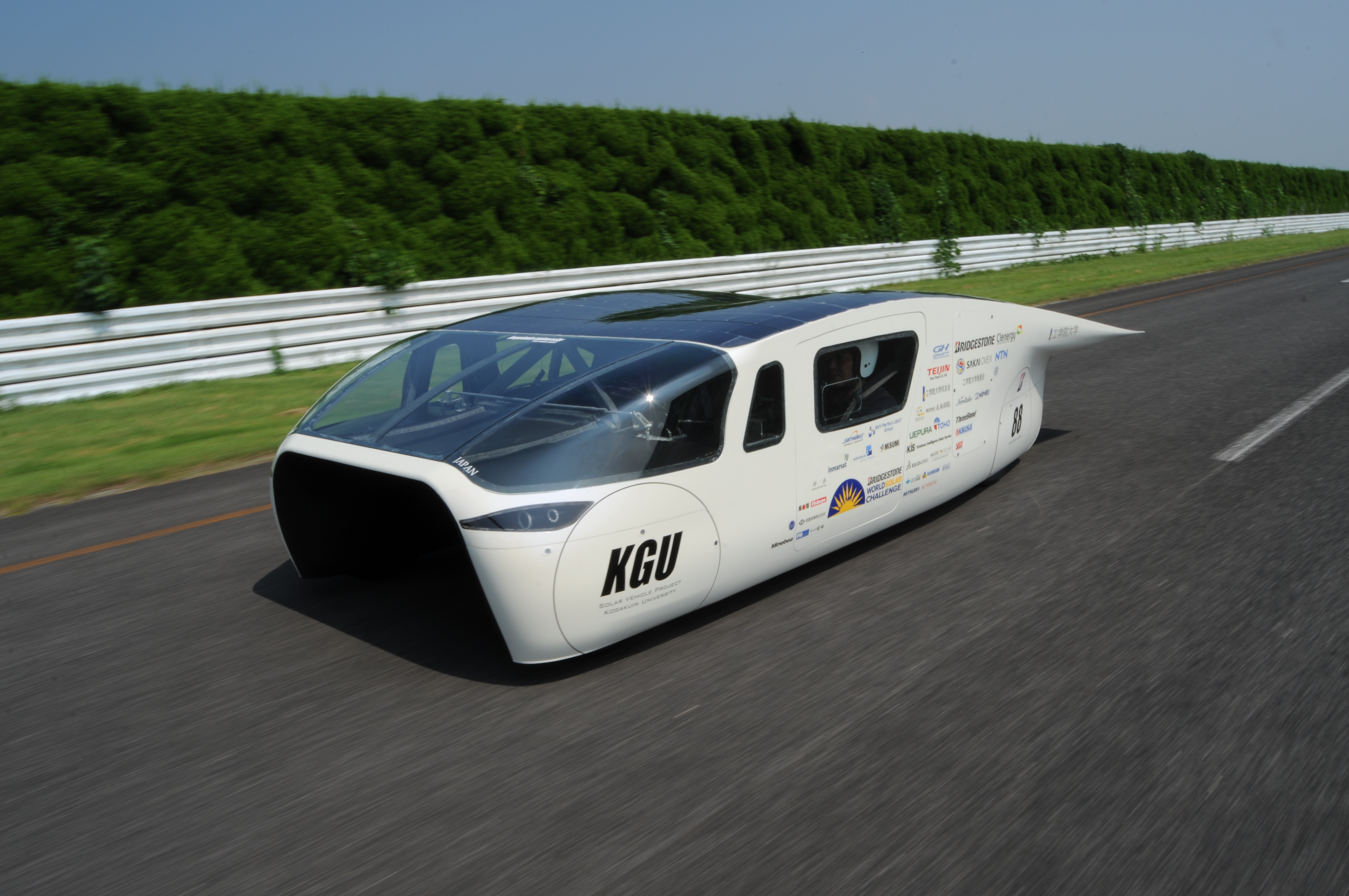
In 2015 Japan's Kogakuin University team took 2nd place in the Cruiser class with a vehicle using a similar layout and overall shape as the Stella Lux.

The second Stella car, built in 2015, improved on its predecessor in a few respects. Frontal surface area was reduced by a catamaran style air tunnel indented in the bottom of the car, along its centerline. Further, Stella Lux has a longer wheelbase and four conventionally opening doors instead of the rudimentary gull-wing doors of the first car. Aside from being more aerodynamic, the new car was also considered somewhat better-looking.

Stella Lux finished after 39 hours and 23 minutes of racing, resulting in a slightly improved average speed of 76.7 kilometres per hour (48 mph) over the course, even though external charging had been reduced to 30 kWh for the 2015 race. During the race, the car set a distance record by driving 1,500 kilometres (932 mi) on a single charge, with an average speed of some 80 kilometres per hour (50 mph), and all the while having two people on board. The car is estimated to have theoretically infinite range when traveling at 45 miles per hour (72 km/h) in good sunlight.

Stella Lux incorporates Vehicle-to-everything (V2X) vehicular communication systems supplied by main sponsor NXP Semiconductors, that help the car and the team to optimize their performance, for instance through the Solar Navigator system, which collects weather data and offers suggestions for an “optimal route” while driving. Power is provided by two in-wheel axial flux motors which can deliver up to 15 kW, while the wheels they power are Schwalbe Solar Energizer 90/80/16s.

Stella Lux specifications
Length	4.52 metres (178 in)
Width	1.76 metres (69 in)
Height	1.12 metres (44 in)
Weight	375 kilograms (827 lb)
Battery Capacity	15 kWh
Solar cells surface area	5.8 square metres (62 sq ft)
Top Speed	125 kilometres per hour (78 mph)
Range on sunny day (Australia)	1,100 kilometres (684 mi)

== Stella Vie ==
For the 2017 edition of the World Solar Challenge, a new Stella car has been designed, sporting five seats instead of four. The new car is longer at 5 metres (197 in) and narrower (1.65 metres (65 in)), though the weight remains unchanged at 375 kilograms (827 lb). The Stella Vie's profile shows a continuous swooping curve from the nose to the boat-tail rear end, that improves the car's aerodynamics, but reduces its solar cell surface area to 5.0 square metres (54 sq ft), as required by the 2017 change in WSC regulations.
On 16 August 2017 Stella Vie was successfully road registered, like its predecessors, for a listed build price of €350,000,-.

Team Eindhoven's Stella Vie car achieved 2.5 times the efficiency of runner-up Bochum, and was awarded the full 80 points for efficiency. The team have carried an average of 3.4 people over the 3021 km, using 45.7 kWh of external energy. By comparison, a Tesla Model S85 (85 kWh battery) has a practical range of about 400 km. Stella Vie's top speed is 130 kilometres per hour (81 mph). After receiving the highest practicality score on the final day of the WSC event as well, the Dutch clinched the title for a hattrick.

== Stella Era ==
Stella Era, Solar Team Eindhoven's fourth-generation solar electric car, purpose-built for the 15th edition of the Bridgestone World Solar Challenge in 2019, performed as well as its predecessors. After the hattrick in 2017, Stella Era delivered a fourth consecutive Cruiser Class championship, and were called "in a class of their own". To win the 2019 Cruiser Cup, solar cars had to complete the journey from Darwin to Adelaide within set time windows, to prove their viability as daily drivers. Out of 13 competitors – twice the number as before – only three finished all legs within the time frames. Stella was dominating with 111.7 points, versus Australia’s Sunswift with 56.1, and Hong Kong’s Team IVE Engineering Solar Car Team with 44.2 points.

The Cruiser Class designs were judged by an expert panel, to evaluate the market potential of each solar electric car. Twelve adjudicators included industry leaders from Tesla, Suntrix and Prohelion, past BWSC and faculty alumni, international solar challenge organizers from Chile, South Africa, and America, and media representatives. The assessment covered characteristics including innovation, environmental impact, ease of access, occupant comfort, control ergonomics, features, styling and overall desirability. The Eindhoven car continued its dominance, winning the practicality rating with a score of 93.1 points, before Lodz with 82.4, and Cambridge University Eco Racing with 79.9 points.

The car built by the team focused on the practical uses of a car, being more than just a mode of transport. It features autonomous driving systems that detect when the car's solar panels are parked in the shade, on a parking lot, and it will automatically move out of the shade, and into the Sun. Moreover, Stella Era is able to share the energy she harvested from the sun with other electric vehicles using her Type 2 charging port. It's the first vehicle of its kind to provide such energy sharing features.

== Stella Vita ==
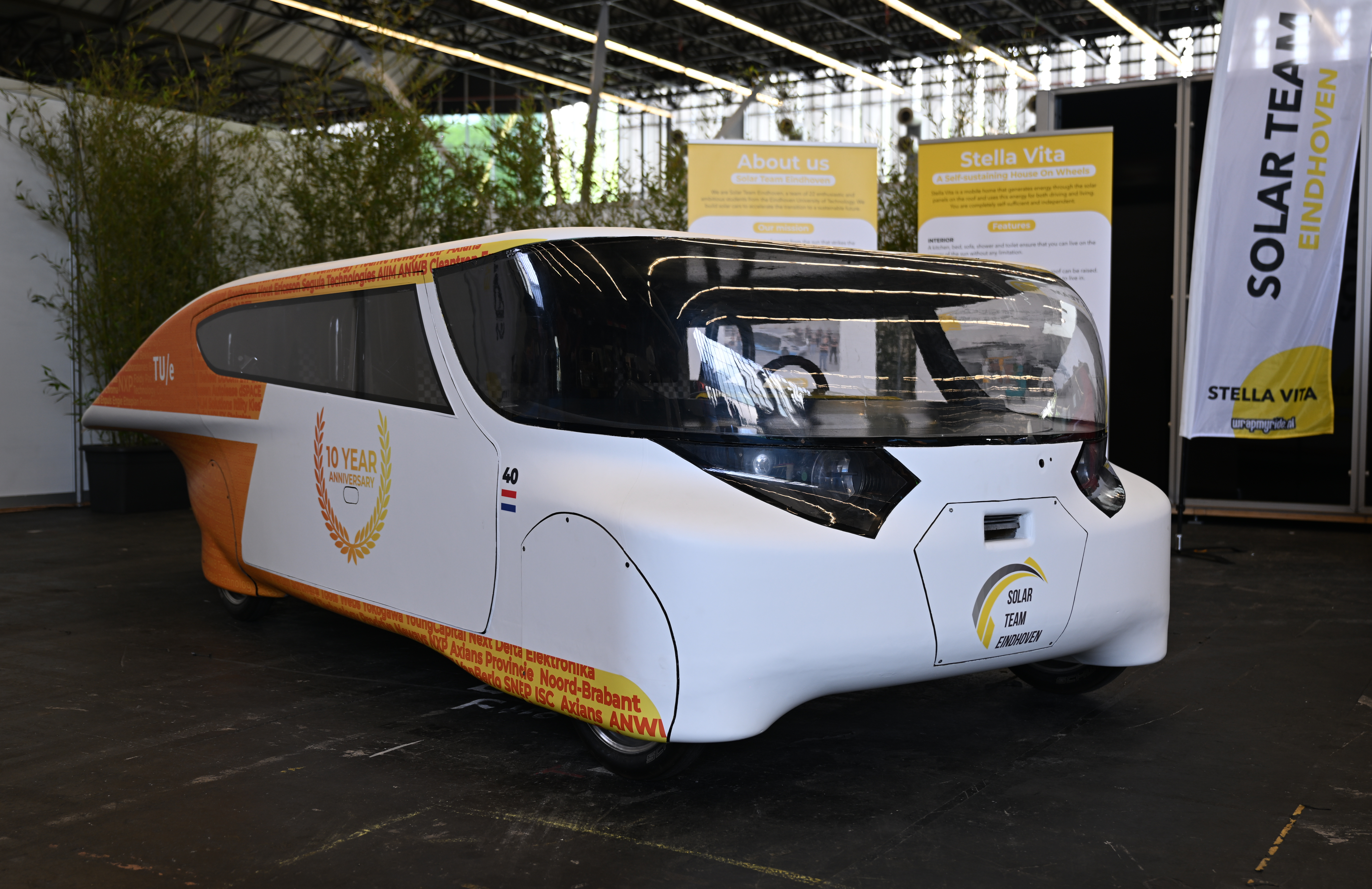
Stella (2013) on display at Fully Charged in 2022

Instead of engineering another solar car for the World Solar Challenge of 2021, Solar Team Eindhoven built Stella Vita. Vita was unveiled in September 2021 and shortly after, the team of 22 students toured Vita through Europe from Eindhoven (the Netherlands) to Tarifa (Spain). Stella Vita is a "self-sustaining house on wheels", a morph of a solar car and a camper. With a rated battery range of 600 km and 730 km on a sunny day and a battery capacity of 60kWh, Vita is incredibly energy efficient. This energy efficiency is a direct result of a streamlined aerodynamic design and fully integrated solar roof. Vita being a proof-of-concept vehicle, it inspires the world as a contributor to the energy transition.

== Stella Terra ==
In line with the changes from the team in 2021, the team has decided to keep out of the BWSC. Instead they built worlds first solar off-road car, presented in September 2023, after which a trip in Morocco was executed to show its capabilities. The trip consisted of driving 1000 km from the northern part of Morocco to the Sahara desert in the south. The road-legal car has a top speed of 145 km/h (90 mph). On a sunny day, its battery range is around 710 km (441 miles) on roads, and around 550 km (342 miles) off-road, depending on the surface. In cloudy conditions, the team estimates the range could be 50 kilometres less. Though it only weighs 1200 kg, the car is made to be robust and reliable and is able to carry two passengers.

== Criticism ==
Criticisms of the Stella concept argue that it is much more practical and efficient to keep the solar panel array at a fixed location, like putting a solar array on the roof of your house, rather than on that of a car. Most houses have enough roof-space to hold a solar array large enough to power both the house itself and one or two electric cars. Additionally, there is no risk of damage that random road debris might do to the cells on a car.

On the other hand, solar-powered cars could potentially be of use in regions where sunlight and space are abundant, and without easy access to grid electricity, where charging facilities are rare.

== See also ==
- List of solar-powered products
- Nuna — A series of solar racing cars, built by a team from the Dutch Delft University of Technology, that have won the World Solar Challenge six times out of the last eight races.
- Sunswift eVe — The fastest car in the 2013 Cruiser class competition of the WSC, built by a team from the University of New South Wales (Australia).
- PowerCore SunCruiser — A three-seat solar racer, built by a team from the Ruhr University Bochum in Germany.
