= Western Sydney University Solar Car Project =

The Western Sydney Solar Team is the student-led, multidisciplinary solar racing team of Western Sydney University based in Penrith, in Sydney, Australia. The team was founded in 2012 and competes in the biennial World Solar Car Challenge (WSC) from Darwin, Northern Territory to Adelaide, South Australia over a distance of 3,022 km (1,878 mi) through the Australian Outback. Since it was established, the team has competed in three World Solar Challenges, placing 11th in 2013, 10th in 2015 and 6th in 2017 in the Challenger Class.

In 2018 the Western Sydney Solar Team was the first Australian team to attend the American Solar Car Challenge and won, becoming the first non-American team to do so.
