= Lightyear 0 =

Solar-electric car

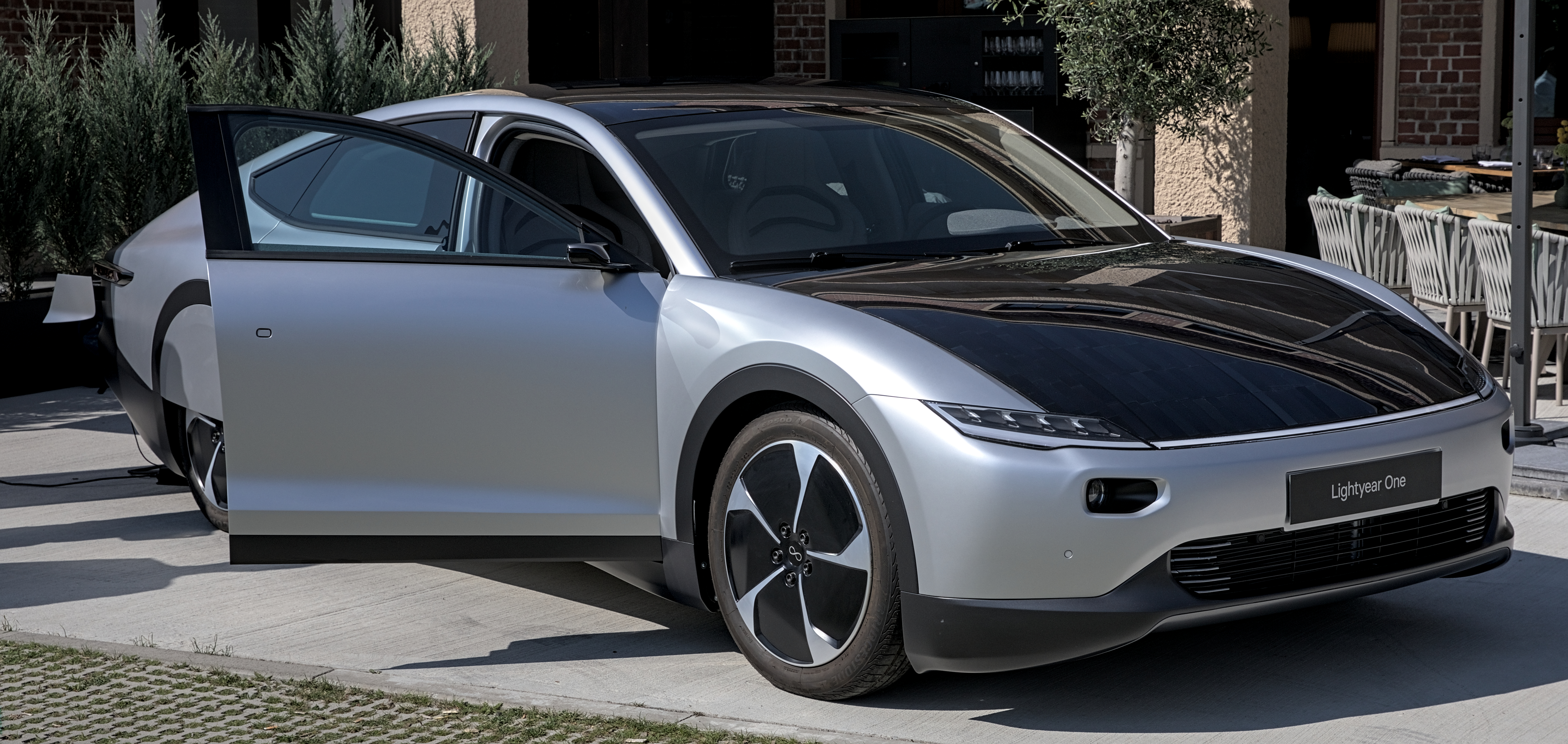
- Lightyear One at Motorworld Munich in 2021

Overview
- Type: Solar car
- Manufacturer: Lightyear
- Production: 2022–2023
- Assembly: Uusikaupunki, Finland (Valmet Automotive)
- Designer: Lowie Vermeersch at Granstudio

Body and chassis
- Class: Executive car (E)
- Body style: 5-door Liftback
- Layout: wheel hub motor, four-wheel-drive

Powertrain
- Engine: 4 electric engines in the wheels
- Power output: 130 kW (170 bhp)
- Battery: 60 kWh
- Electric range: 625 km (388 miles) (WLTP)

Dimensions
- Length: 5,057 mm
- Width: 1,898 mm
- Height: 1,426 mm
- Curb weight: ~ 1,575 kg (3,472 lb)

The Lightyear 0 (formerly the Lightyear One) was an all-solar-electric car by the Dutch car manufacturer Lightyear. Production was originally scheduled to start in 2021, with a starting price of €250,000 incl. VAT. The first units were delivered in December 2022. In January 2023, Lightyear announced that it was halting production of the 0 model, and that Atlas Technologies B.V., the subsidiary responsible for the manufacture of the Lightyear 0, would be allowed to go bankrupt. After a restart and new investments, the company initially announced plans to focus on a more affordable model, the Lightyear 2,. Instead, in 2023 the company came out of bankruptcy under new management, and the company refocused itself on developing charging technology for other manufacturers, in particular Nissan.

== Overview ==
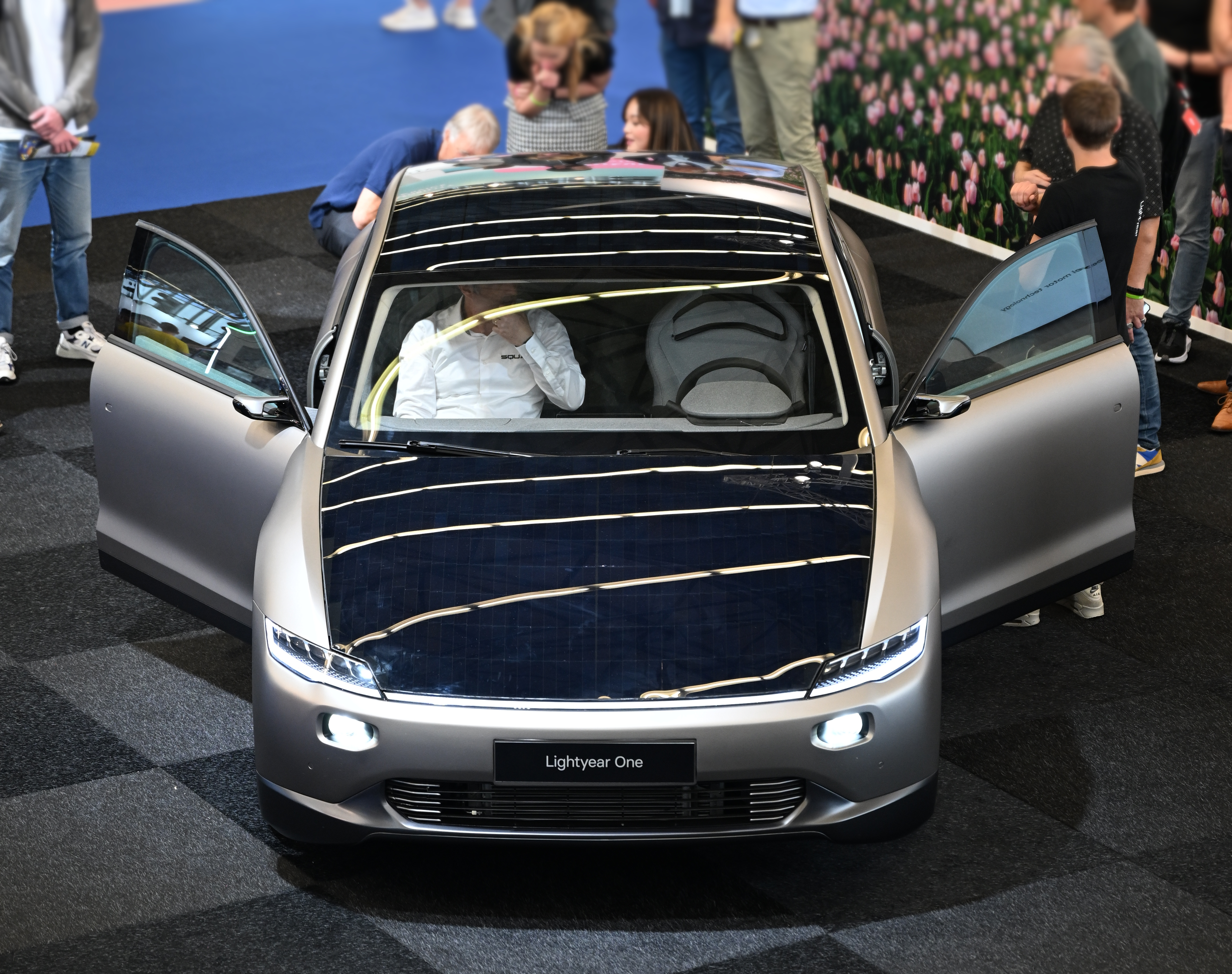
Lightyear One at Fully Charged Europe 2022

The Lightyear 0 was a large fastback, with the bonnet, roof, and boot clad covered with 5 m^{2} (54 ft^{2}) of solar cells, producing a WLTP range of 625 km (388 miles). The Lightyear company claimed the 782 solar cells across the car could add 70 km (43.5 miles) of range per day during summer. The aerodynamics of the vehicle were stated to produce a record-low drag coefficient of Cd=0.175.

The car was all-wheel drive, with four in-wheel electric hub motors powered by a low-mounted battery. It seated five adults and luggage.

== History ==
The solar panel design was born out of the Solar Team Eindhoven's solar-powered cars for the World Solar Challenge. Design work on the Lightyear 0 was carried out together with Granstudio in Italy.

== Price and availability ==
Announced on 25 June 2019, production was scheduled to start in 2021, mentioning a starting price of €119,000 excl. VAT. In September 2021, Lightyear was reported to have raised to bring the vehicle to production, and delivering the first units in 2022, for €250,000 excl. VAT. The company announced in December 2022 that production had begun, at a rate of one car per week. Availability was limited to customers in the EU, Switzerland, Norway and the UK.

In January 2023 Lightyear announced that it was halting production of the car. Only about a dozen cars were made before production ended.

== Gallery ==
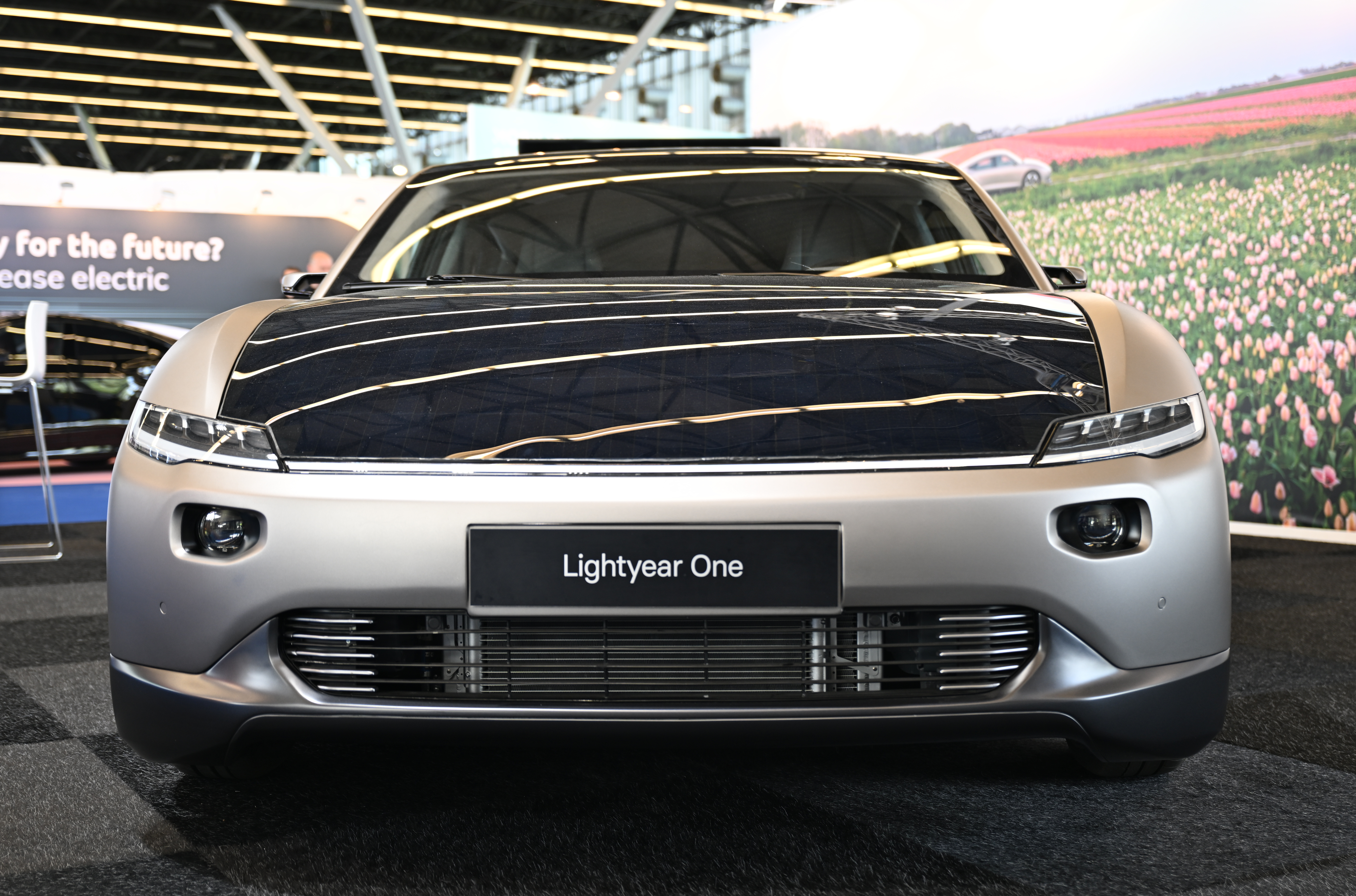
Front view

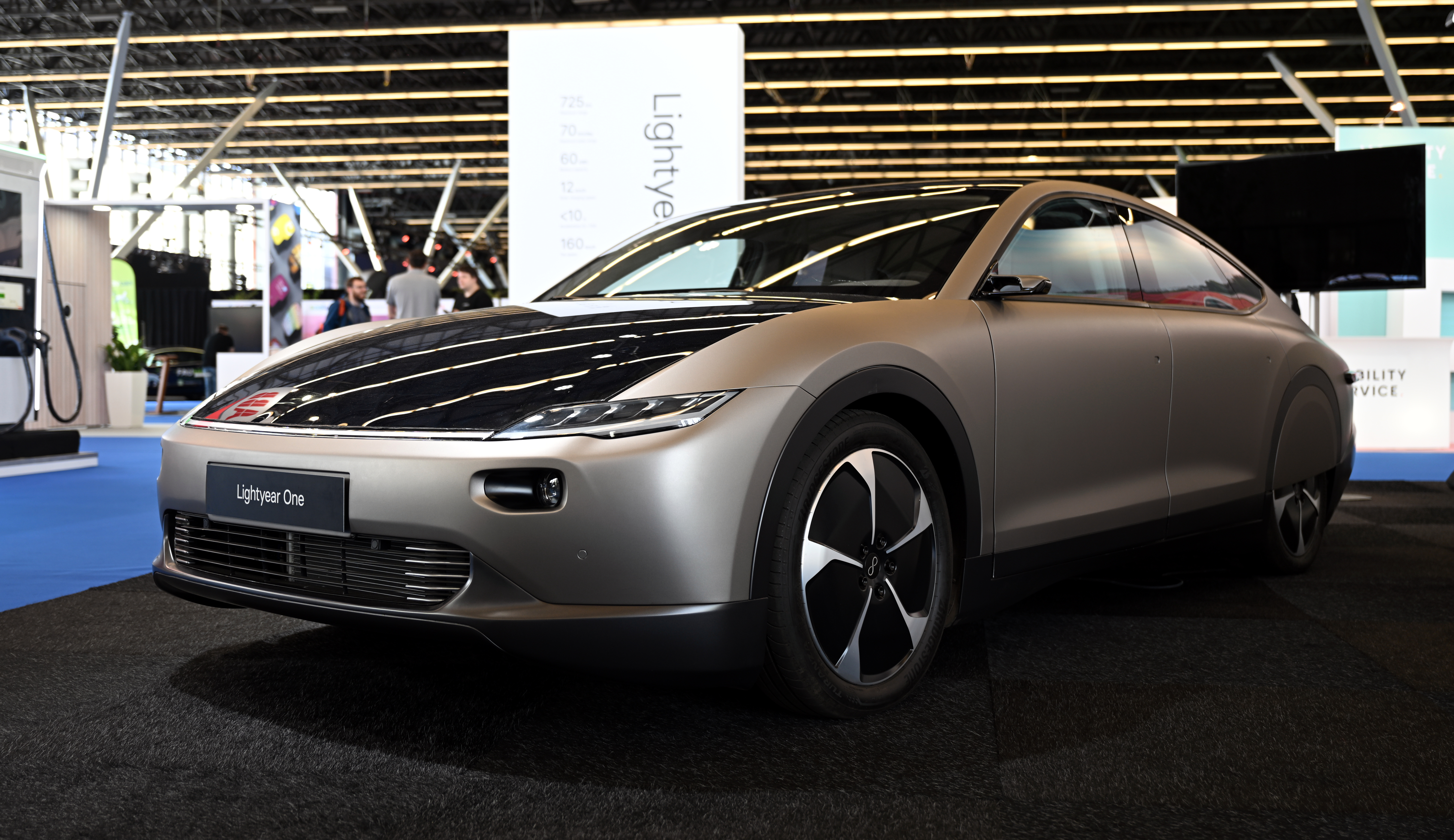
Front and side view

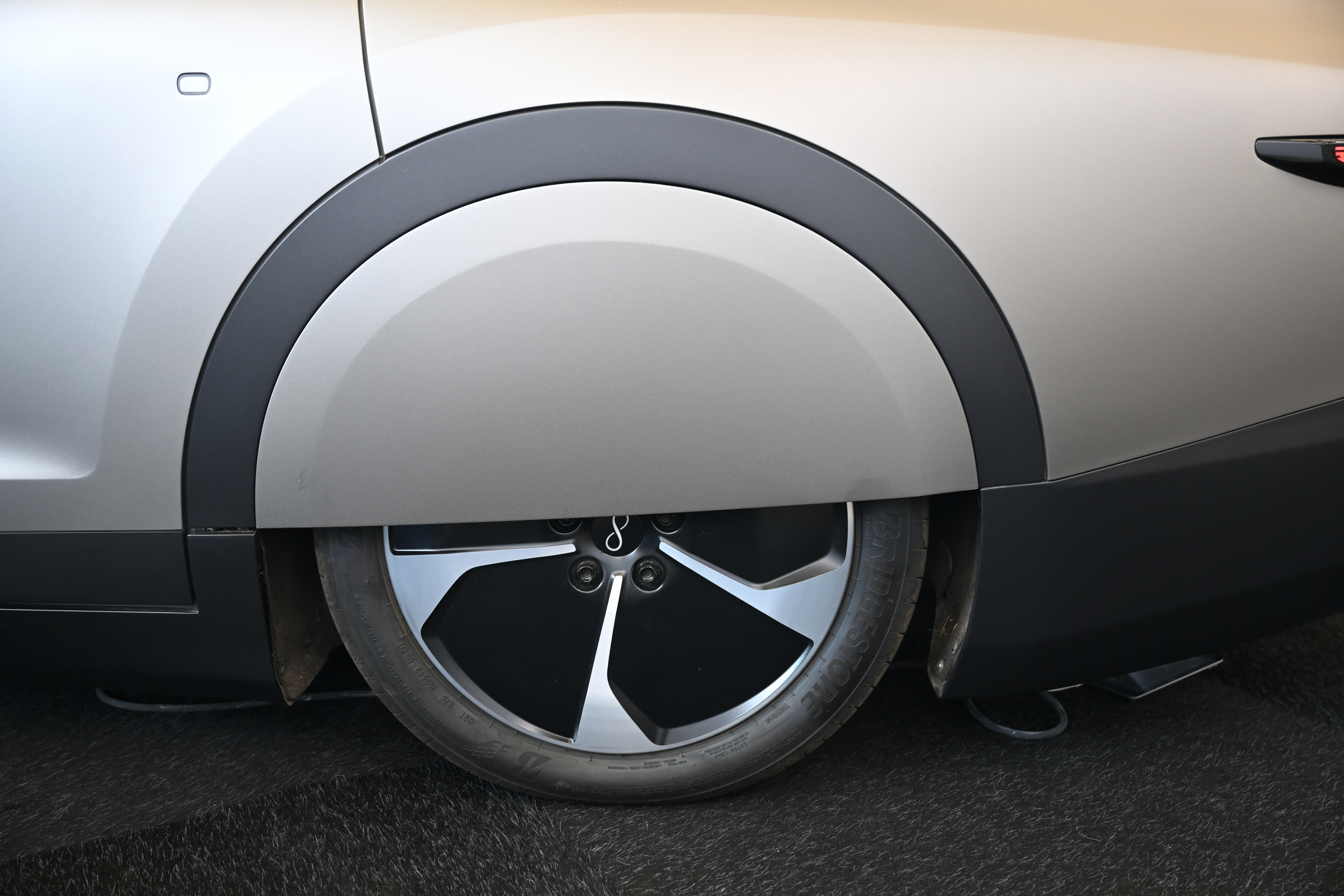
Wheel and aerocover

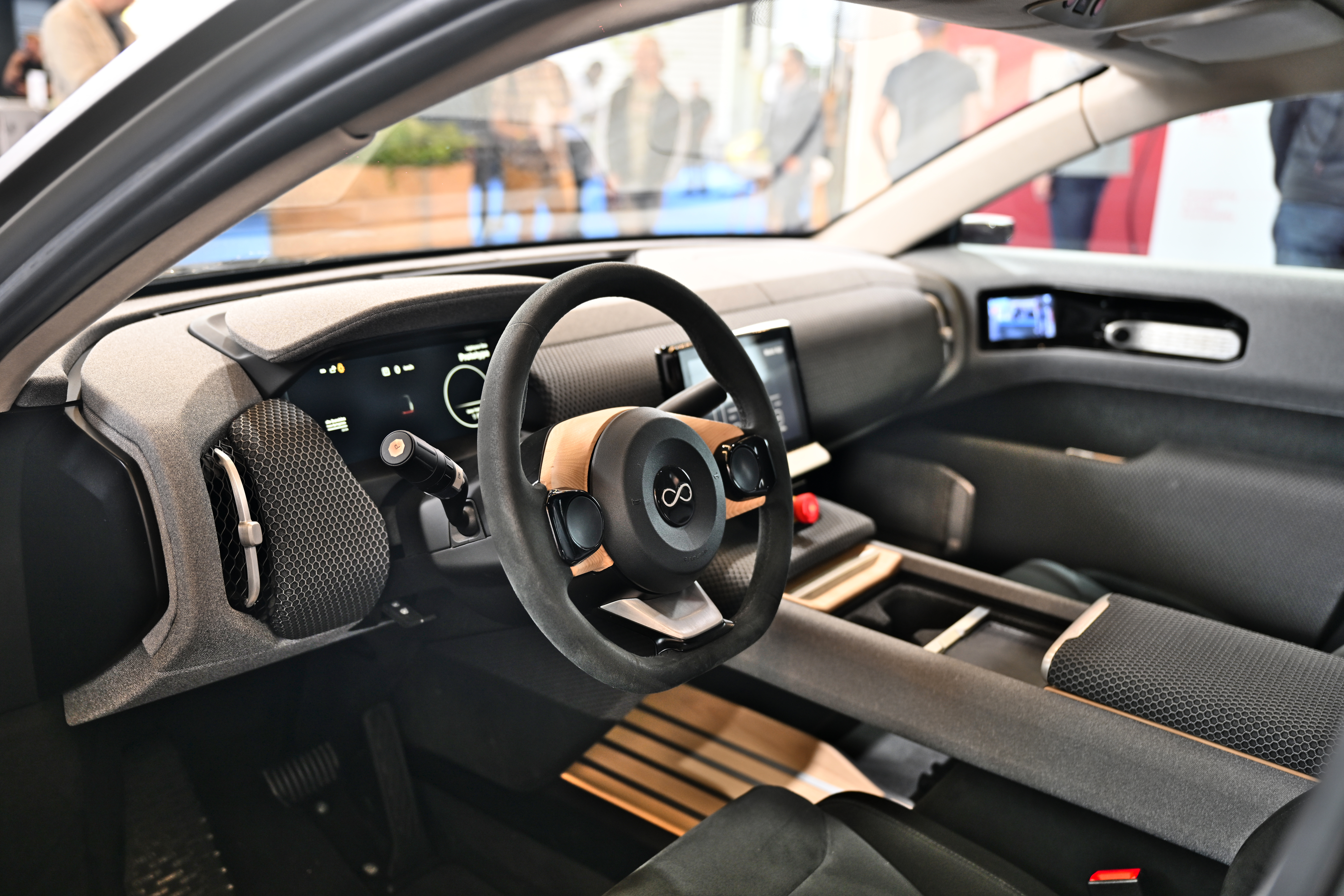
Interior view

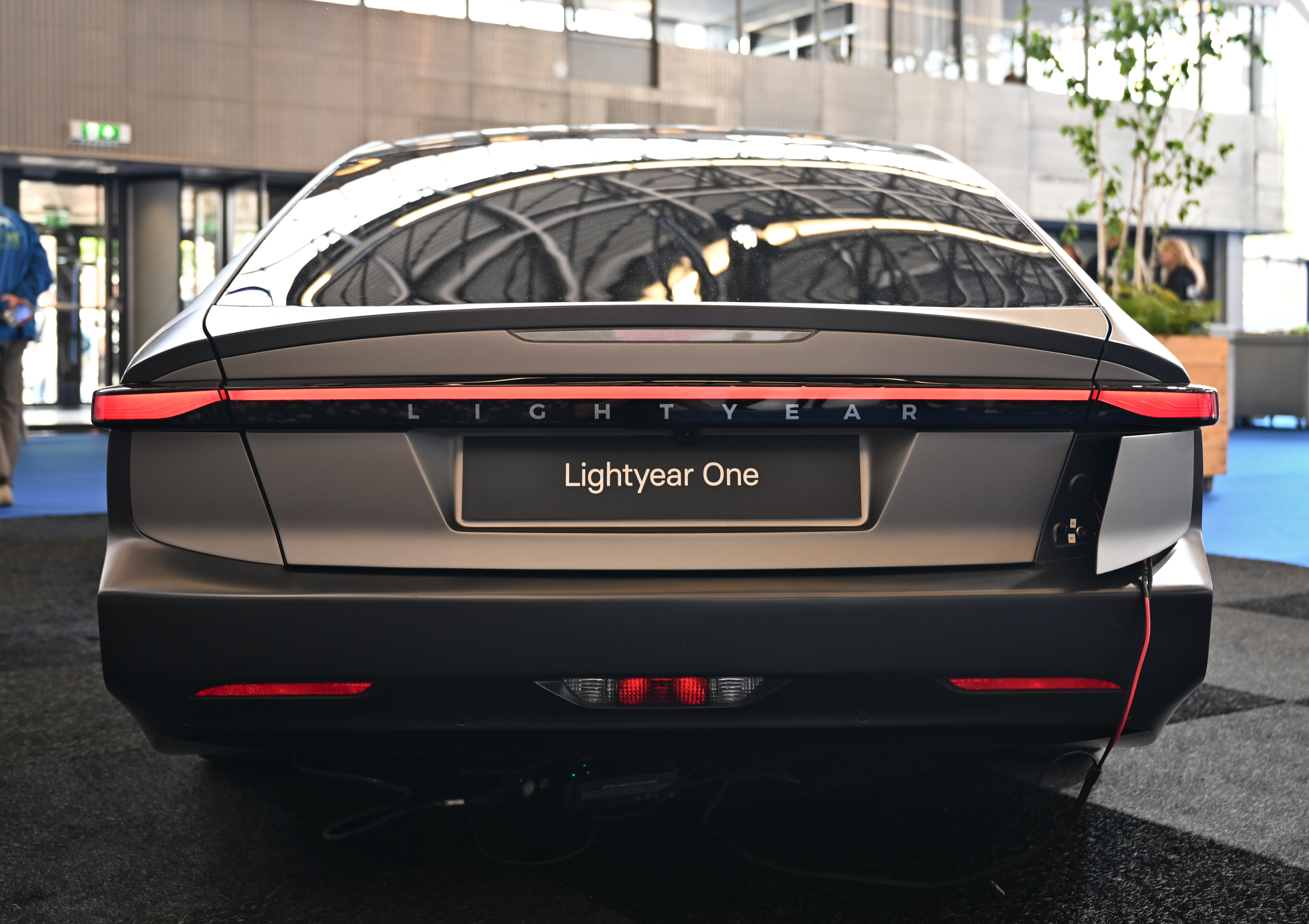
Rear view
