= Jaycar =

Australian electronics retailer

- Type: Private
- Industry: Retail
- Founded: 1981; 45 years ago
- Founder: Gary Johnston
- Headquarters: Rhodes, NSW
- Number of locations: 143 stores (2026)
- Area served: Australia; New Zealand
- Key people: Justin Mackedie (CEO)
- Products: Electronics, gadgets
- Number of employees: c.1,000 (2021)
- Subsidiaries: Electus Distribution
- Website: jaycar.com.au

Jaycar Electronics is an Australian international retailer dealing in electronic components, technical support, and other products and services for electronics enthusiasts. The company owns over 130 stores across Australia and New Zealand, and also sells its products online in the UK and US. It was founded in 1981 by Gary Johnston, who remained managing director until his death in 2021.

The company also has a wholesaling branch, Electus Distribution, which operates in Australia and New Zealand.

== History ==
Jaycar was founded when Gary Johnston, a former Dick Smith Electronics employee, purchased John Carr & Co. Pty Ltd. He became managing director of the company.

In 2005, Jaycar received negative attention from its imported Taiwanese "Choke-A-Chicken" toy that squawked and flapped its wings when strangled around its neck, described by the RSPCA Queensland as "grossly irresponsible".

In October 2012, remarks made by Johnston on Sydney radio station 2GB, seen as providing justification for sexist behaviour by unidentified staff at the Canterbury-Bankstown NRL club (Bulldogs), of which Jaycar was a major sponsor at the time, caused controversy. There were calls to boycott Jaycar stores.

In October 2016, Freetronics owner Jonathan Oxer accused Jaycar of copying his business's open source Arduino Experimenters kit in two videos posted to his YouTube channel.

In September 2018 Johnston ended Jaycar's sponsorship of the Bulldogs, following questionable behaviour from players during Mad Monday celebrations.

Johnston died on 10 March 2021, after being diagnosed with mesothelioma two weeks earlier.

Jaycar acquired Burnsco, a large chandlery business in December 2021

== Description ==
As of 2011, Jaycar has over 110 stores across Australian and New Zealand, and more than 170 authorised stockists and agents that carry Jaycar products. The group also owns a number of Road Tech Marine stores.

Electus Distribution is Jaycar's wholesale arm. It operates as a separate company and provides products to independent and other retailers, as well as original equipment manufacturers, in Australia and New Zealand.

== Community involvement ==
Jaycar became a major sponsor of NRL club Canterbury-Bankstown Bulldogs in 2009, but questionable behaviour from players led Johnston to end the partnership in September 2018. Jaycar sponsors Warby Motorsport and a number of local sports teams. Jaycar has sponsored the Western Suburbs Magpies rugby league team, based in western Sydney, since 2019. Johnston had been a "lifelong supporter".

The company has supported or hosted maker culture events, and supports several charities, including:

- Starlight Children's Foundation
- Charlie Teo Foundation
- Operation Restore Hope
- FSHD Global Research Foundation
- Steve Waugh Foundation
- Exodus Foundation
- Save our Sons

== See also ==
- Jaycar Sunswift III
- Element-14 / Farnell
- RS Components
