= Formula-G =

Solar car championship

Formula-G or Turkish Solar Car Grand Prix is a solar car championship started in 2005. The last race was done in 2014.

== Results ==
Formula-G 2014 Results
Rank	Solar Car	Lap	Best record (minute)
1	Sakarya University	20	
2	İTÜ ARIBA-7	18	
3	Trakya University	17	

Formula-G 2013 Results
Rank	Solar Car	Lap	Best record (minute)
1	Sakarya University SAGUAR 2		
2	İÜ SOCRAT-13		
3	Dokuz Eylül University SMYRNA		

Formula-G 2012 Results
Rank	Solar Car	Lap	Best record (minute)
1			
2			
3	İTÜ ARIBA-5		

Formula-G 2011 Results
Rank	Solar Car	Lap	Best record (minute)
1			
2			
3			

Formula-G 2010 Results
Rank	Solar Car	Lap	Best record (minute)
1			
2			
3			

Formula-G 2009 Results
Rank	Solar Car	Lap	Best record (minute)
1	İÜ SOCRATR	25	
2	Anadolu University		
3	Uludag University		

Formula-G 2008 Results
Rank	Solar Car	Lap	Best record (minute)
1	İTÜ RA	30	
2	İTÜ ARIBA-2	30	
3	Boğaziçi University	29	

Formula-G 2007 Results
Rank	Solar Car	Lap	Best record (minute)
1	İTÜ ARIBA-1	30	1:53.881
2	İTÜ ARIBA-2	30	1:55.578
3	SAÜ SAGUAR X6	29	1:58.609

Formula-G 2006 Türkiye Kupası Yarış Sonuçları Tablosu
Rank	Solar Car	Lap	Best record (minute)
1	İTÜ ARIBA-1	30	2:42.872
2	İTÜ ARIBA-2	28	2:53.937
3	YTÜ BARRACUDA	25	3:11.131

Formula-G 2006 Ege Kupası Yarış Sonuçları Tablosu
Rank	Solar Car	Lap	Best record (minute)
1	İTÜ ARIBA-1	30	2:18.003
2	SAÜ SAGUAR X5	30	2:19.438
3	İTÜ ARIBA-2	25	2:46.859

Formula-G 2005 Yarış Sonuçları Tablosu
Rank	Solar Car	Lap	Best record (minute)
1	ORT	8	9:53.349
2	Hasat	7	8:39.952
3	YUGAT	6	7:24.238

== Competing teams ==
- Istanbul Technical University
- İYTE Formula
- Middle East Technical University Robot Society Formula
- Sakarya University
- Kocaeli University Mechatronics Engineering
- Yildiz Technical University
- Ankara University
- Middle East Technical University Robot Society
- Atılım University Solar Car Team
