= UNSW Sunswift =

Solar car racing team of the University of New South Wales

Sunswift Racing is the solar car racing team of the University of New South Wales in Sydney, Australia. The team currently holds a number of world records and is best known for its participation in the World Solar Challenge (WSC). Since its founding in 1996 by Byron Kennedy, the Sunswift team has built a total of 7 cars, the most recent of which is Sunswift 7.

== Sunswift Team ==
The team primarily consists of undergraduate students from various disciplines including business, engineering and industrial design. Although most team members are engaged in full-time study, Sunswift has remained competitive in the solar car challenges it has entered. A number of former team members have gone on to establish their own companies, and others have taken positions in industry, including with racing teams such as those in Formula 1. Some former members remain in contact with Sunswift after graduation and act as mentors or advisors to newer recruits, helping to maintain the standards the team has followed since its founding in 1996.

== Outreach program ==
The Sunswift team also conducts outreach in the local community, educating the general public about the advantages of solar-powered vehicles over conventionally powered ones. To this end, they regularly showcase the series of Sunswift cars at exhibitions and hold information days open to the public. Sunswift also visits schools to teach students about solar power technology and its use in powering a car.

== How it works ==
All solar cars have at least five main parts to their power system: the solar array, maximum power point tracker (MPPT), battery, motor controller and electric motor. These cars rely on converting the electromagnetic energy of the sun into electrical energy, through the use of photovoltaic cells, and then converting that electrical energy into mechanical energy to drive the car, through the use of some form of electric motor. Maximum power point trackers act as an interface between the solar array and the battery, while motor controllers act as an interface between the battery and the electric motors

As sunlight shines on the solar array, it transfers energy to the electrons within the photovoltaic cells, thus allowing them to conduct electricity and causing a current to flow. This current then travels to the MPPTs, which alter the load across the solar array in order to ensure that it is generating electricity as efficiently as possible. The MPPTs have to constantly monitor the output of the photovoltaic cells because that output depends on the light intensity, which can change rapidly if some cells become shaded. The electricity then flows into the battery, where it can be stored for later use, such as to drive the car while there is no sunlight. Although the battery is primarily charged by the solar panels, it can also be charged externally using conventionally generated electricity at a home or workplace. The battery then discharges the current into the motor controllers, which convert it into a form that can be used to power the electric motor. Motor controllers are also used to manage functions such as speed regulation, cruise control and regenerative braking. Regenerative braking uses the existing motors as generators, converting the rotational energy of the wheels back into electrical energy, slowing the car down and recharging the battery at the same time, instead of relying only on conventional mechanical brakes. Lastly, the energy that was once in the sunlight shining on the car reaches the electric motors, which operate on the principles of electromagnetism to turn that electrical energy into rotational energy that spins the wheels and drives the car forward.

== Sunswift 7 (2020–present) ==
Sunswift 7 (SR7) is the third Sunswift vehicle designed to compete in the Bridgestone World Solar Challenge Cruiser Class. Design began in 2020, with the intention of competing in the 2021 World Solar Challenge, which was cancelled.

In December 2022, Sunswift achieved a Guinness World Record for the Fastest EV over 1,000 km (621 mi) on a single charge. It achieved this in 11 hours and 52.08 minutes, at an average speed of almost 85 km/h (53 mph).

In October 2023, Sunswift won the 2023 World Solar Challenge, Cruiser Class. The car achieved an on-road score of 109.4, a practicality score of 83.3% and a final score of 91.1. The team placed first for both the on-road score and practicality score.

Technical Specifications for Sunswift 7
Dimensions	Length: 4,990 mm (196.5 in); Width: 2,050 mm (80.7 in); Height: 1,200 mm (47.2 in); Wheel Base: 3,120 mm (122.8 in)
Weight	680 kg (1,500 lb)
Aerodynamics	Cd: 0.095; Frontal Area: 1.86 m^{2} (20.0 sq ft); CdA: 0.177
Chassis	Carbon fibre monocoque with foam and aramid honeycomb core
Bodywork	Custom Dihedral Synchro Helix Doors. Audi A7 Headlights
Suspension	Generatively designed, SLM 3D-printed uprights with carbon fibre wishbones and pushrods; Front: Double wishbone with pushrod activated shock; Rear: Multi link
Battery	38kWh, 151.2V
Solar Array	4.4 m^{2} (47 sq ft)
Seats	4
Motors	Twin, rear wheel, in hub, synchronous DC motors, both of which are brushless and have permanent magnets
Top Speed	130 km/h (81 mph)
Range	1,500 km (930 mi)

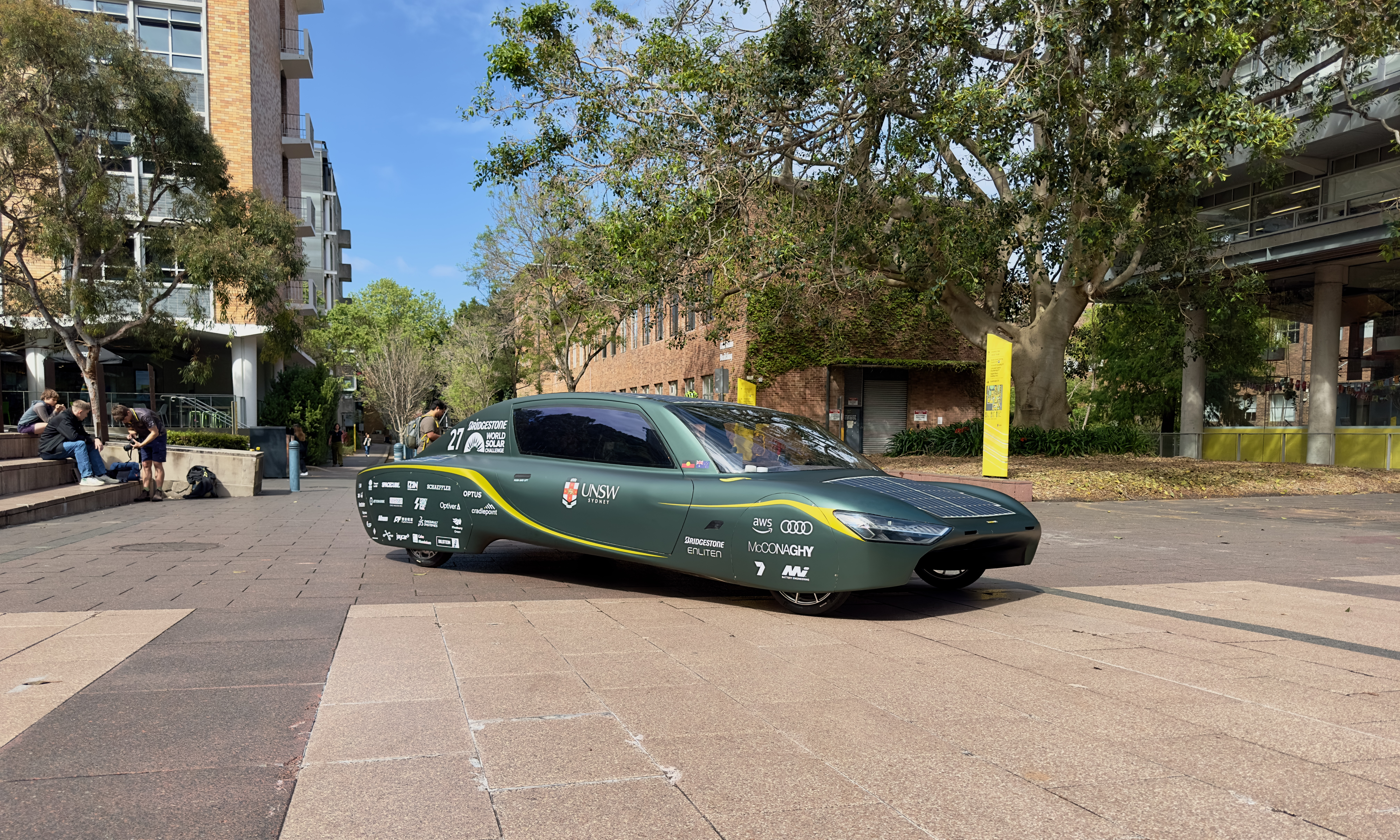
Sunswift 7 in its BWSC Race Livery

== Sunswift VI (VIolet) (2017–2019) ==
VIolet is the sixth vehicle designed and manufactured by Sunswift. It was the second Sunswift vehicle built to compete in the Cruiser Class. Design of VIolet began in 2016 and manufacture was completed in late 2017. VIolet is Sunswift's first four-seat, four-door vehicle, and has a 5-square-metre solar array consisting of 318 monocrystalline silicon cells with an approximate efficiency of 22%. VIolet was designed with a greater focus on practicality, with the aim of resembling a more comfortable family vehicle in comparison to previous generations of Sunswift vehicles. Features implemented in VIolet include live monitoring and fault detection, entertainment systems, air conditioning, navigation, wifi, a reverse camera, adjustable seating, parking sensors, front and back boot-space, and an ergonomic dashboard. The vehicle competed in the 2017 World Solar Challenge and placed third in practicality.

In December 2018, the team drove from Perth to set a Guinness World Record for the lowest energy consumption while driving across Australia in an electric car. VIolet was then further tested and refined for reliability and efficiency, leading to 2nd place overall in the 2019 Bridgestone World Solar Challenge, Sunswift's highest-ever ranking, and finishing first across the line in Adelaide.

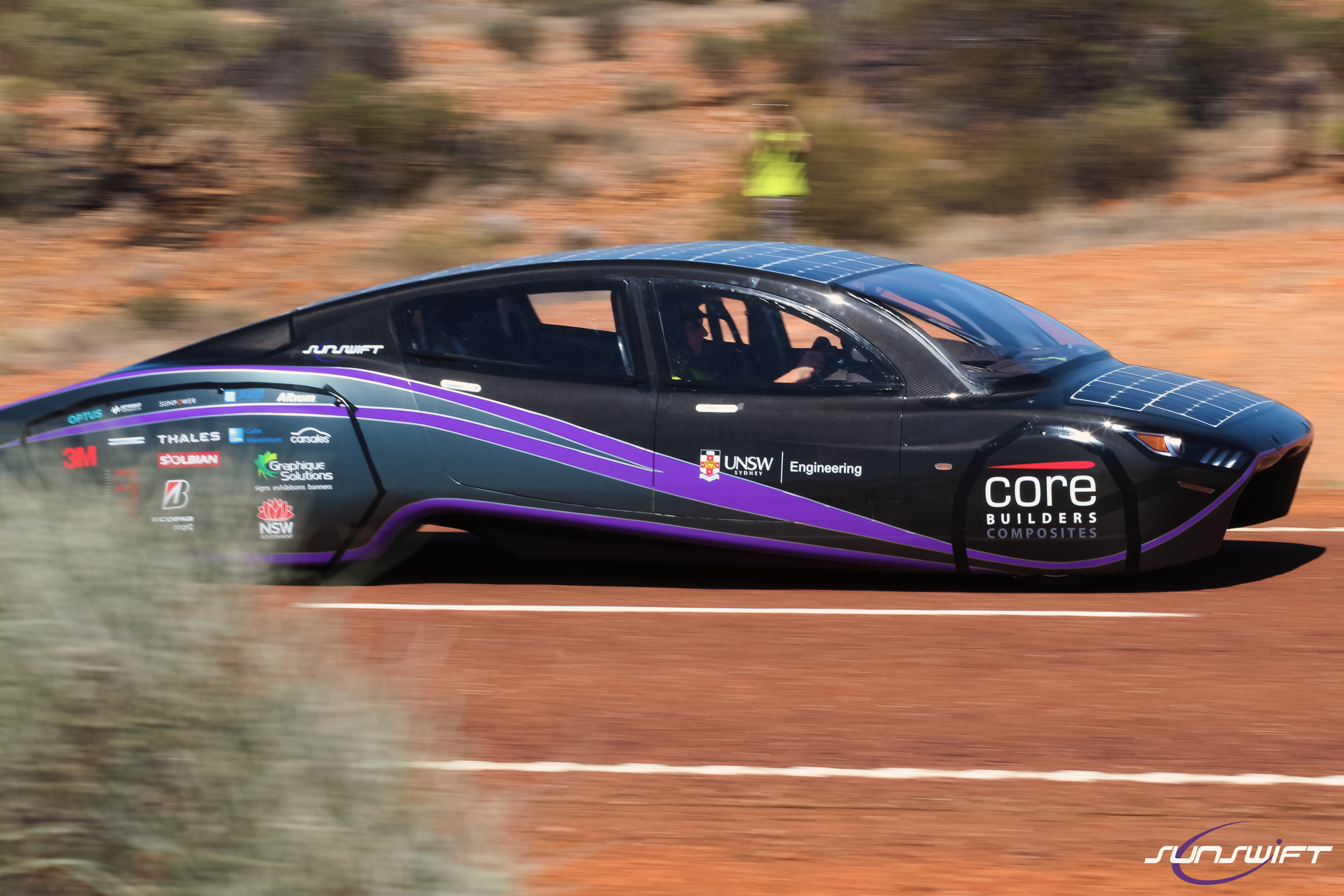
Appearance of the Violet

Technical specifications for VIolet
Dimensions	Length: 5.0 metres (16 ft 5 in) Width: 2.2 metres (7 ft 2 in) Height: 1.2 metres (3 ft 11 in)
Weight	700 kilograms (no driver)
Solar Cells/Array	5.00-square-metre (53.7 sq ft) array consisting of 318 monocrystalline silicon cells with an approximate efficiency of 22%
Seats	4
Chassis	Carbon fibre monocoque with foam and an aramid honeycomb core
Motors	Twin, rear wheel, in hub, synchronous DC motors, both of which are brushless and have permanent magnets
Maximum speed	140 kilometres/h (87 mph)
Maximum speed solely on solar power	60 kilometres/h
Maximum range	1000 km at a speed of 100 kilometres/h
Battery Power	Modular 10-20 kilowatt-hours (36-72 MJ) lithium ion at a nominal voltage between 90 and 153V
Telemetry	Custom Controlled Area Network (CAN) including GPS, barometric pressure, motor speeds, motor temperatures, tilt, and various voltages and currents

== Sunswift V (eVe) (2012–2016) ==
The design and construction of eVe began in early 2012 and was completed within 18 months in time for the 2013 World Solar Challenge. The car cost approximately $500,000 and was built to compete in the new Cruiser Class in the WSC. This class focused on more practical solar cars with passenger seats, greater safety and more efficient batteries. To reflect its focus on practicality, the team also designed it to resemble a modern-day sports car, rather than the typical space-age style of most other solar vehicles. The car was the fastest vehicle in the Cruiser Class, achieving Line Honours and third place overall in the Cruiser Class while also attaining the highest top speed of 128 kilometres per hour (80 mph).

On a single charge of its batteries, eVe can travel up to 500 kilometres (310 mi) or over 800 kilometres (500 mi) if powered by its own solar cells. Once fully depleted, the batteries can be completely recharged in 10 hours using a standard household power socket or in under 7 hours using a commercial power socket. In terms of cost and efficiency, for every 100 km the solar car would cost approximately $0.20 compared to the average $15 for conventional petrol powered cars.

In July 2014, the Sunswift team broke an FIA World Record, overseen by the Confederation of Australian Motorsport, for the fastest electric vehicle capable of travelling 500 kilometres (310 mi) on a single battery charge. The team beat the previous record 73 kilometres per hour (45 mph) – set in 1988 – with an average speed of 107 kilometres per hour (66 mph) over the 500-kilometre (310 mi) distance, which was done at the Australian Automotive Research Centre in Victoria. This record was not an exclusive solar car record, but was open to any electric vehicle weighing under 500 kilograms (1,100 lb). Consequently, for this record the solar cells were disconnected from the electrical systems, and the car ran only on its lithium-ion battery pack.

The team worked towards road-legal status for eVe, with plans to officially register it as Australia's first road legal solar car. This would make eVe one of the few road legal solar cars in the world and the first to adhere to the Australian Design Rules.

Technical specifications for eVe
Dimensions	Length: 4.5 metres (15 ft); Width: 1.8 metres (5 ft 11 in); Height: 1.1 metres (3 ft 7 in)
Weight	430 kilograms (950 lb)
Solar Cells/Array	4-square-metre (43 sq ft) array. All cells are monocrystalline silicon with an approximate efficiency of >23%
Seats	2 made of carbon fibre, each with a 3-point safety harness
Chassis	Carbon fibre monocoque with foam and an aramid honeycomb core
Motors	Twin, rear wheel, in hub, synchronous DC motors, both of which are brushless and have permanent magnets
Maximum speed	Achieved: 132 kilometres per hour (82 mph); Theoretical: 140 kilometres per hour (87 mph)
Battery Power	16 kilowatt-hours (58 MJ)
Telemetry	Custom Controlled Area Network (CAN) including GPS, barometric pressure, motor speeds, motor temperatures, tilt, and various voltages and currents

== Sunswift IV (IVy) (2009–2011) ==
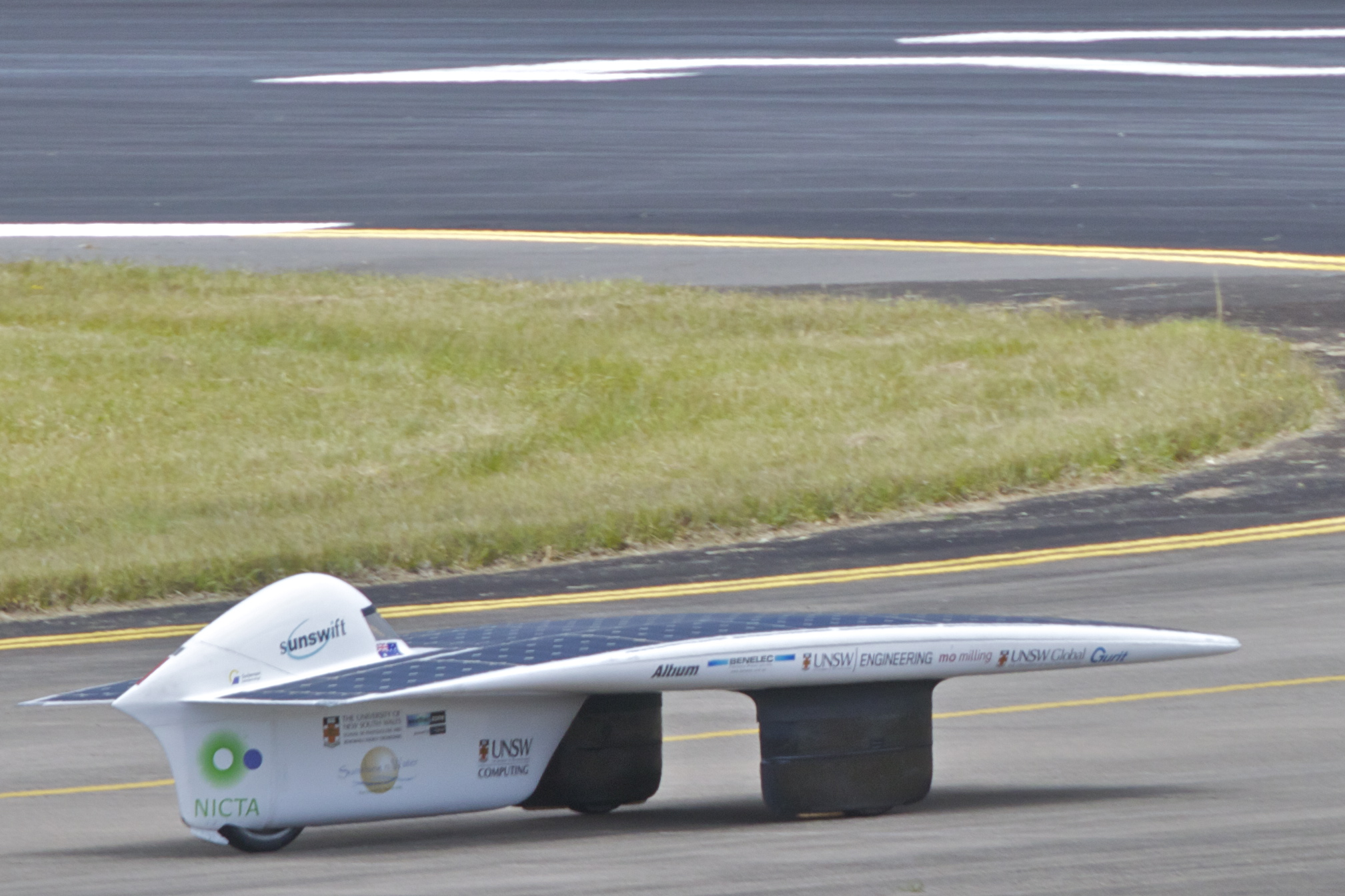
Sunswift IVy during the Guinness World Record speed attempt.

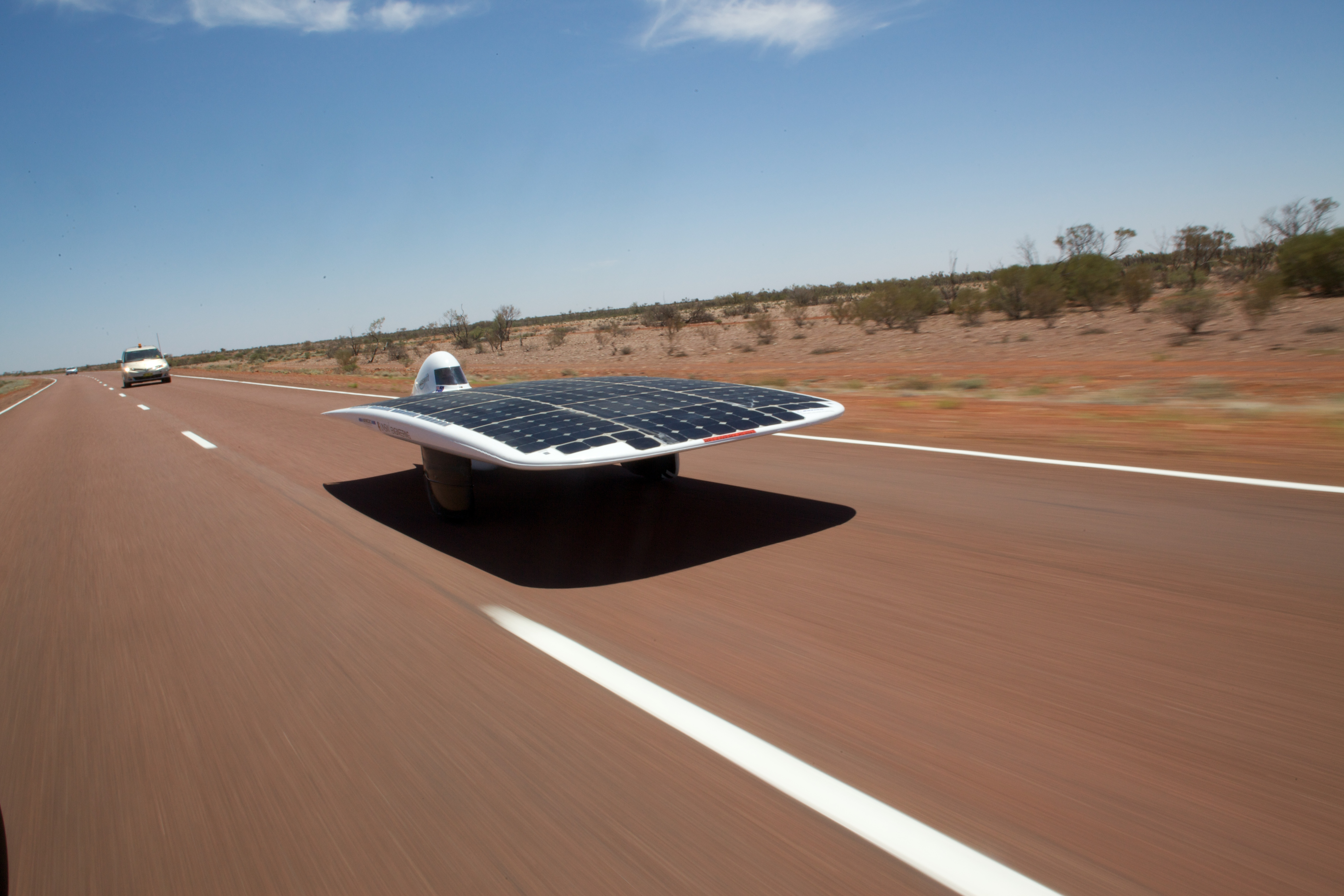
Sunswift IV (IVy) during the 2009 Global Green Challenge from Darwin to Adelaide

As with eVe, IVy was built to compete in the World Solar Challenge, specifically for the 2009 race. However, unlike eVe, IVy raced as part of the Challenger Class and Challenger Class Silicon, finishing 4th overall while being the first silicon- powered car across the line. The project took approximately 18 months and $250,000 to complete. On 7 January 2011, at the Royal Australian Navy airbase, HMAS Albatross, IVy broke the Guinness World Record for the fastest solar powered vehicle. Australian racing driver Barton Mawer brought IVy to a top speed of 88.5 kilometres per hour (55.0 mph), beating the 22-year-old previous record by over 10 kilometres per hour (6.2 mph). The rules of the record required that IVy be powered solely by the sun; with the entire battery pack removed, the car weighed 140 kilograms (310 lb).

Technical specifications for Sunswift IV
Dimensions	Length: 4.6 metres (15 ft); Width: 1.8 metres (5 ft 11 in); Height: 0.93 metres (3 ft 1 in)
Weight	165 kilograms (364 lb)
Solar Cells/Array	5.99-square-metre (64.5 sq ft) permanent array consisting of 397 A300's at 22% efficiency and 56 UNSW TopCells at 16% efficiency
Seats	No conventional seat. The driver's compartment is part of the chassis
Chassis	Carbon fibre monocoque with pre-preg carbon fibre and a nomex honeycomb, as well as a fibreglass canopy
Motors	Single, rear wheel, brushless, synchronous DC motor with permanent magnets
Maximum speed	110 km/h (88.7 km/h on solar alone)
Battery Power	4.85 kilowatt-hours (17.5 MJ) at a voltage between 89.1 and 138.6 V
Telemetry	Custom Controlled Area Network (CAN) including GPS, tyre pressure, motor speeds, motor temperatures, brake temperature, and various voltages and currents

== Sunswift III (2005–2008) ==
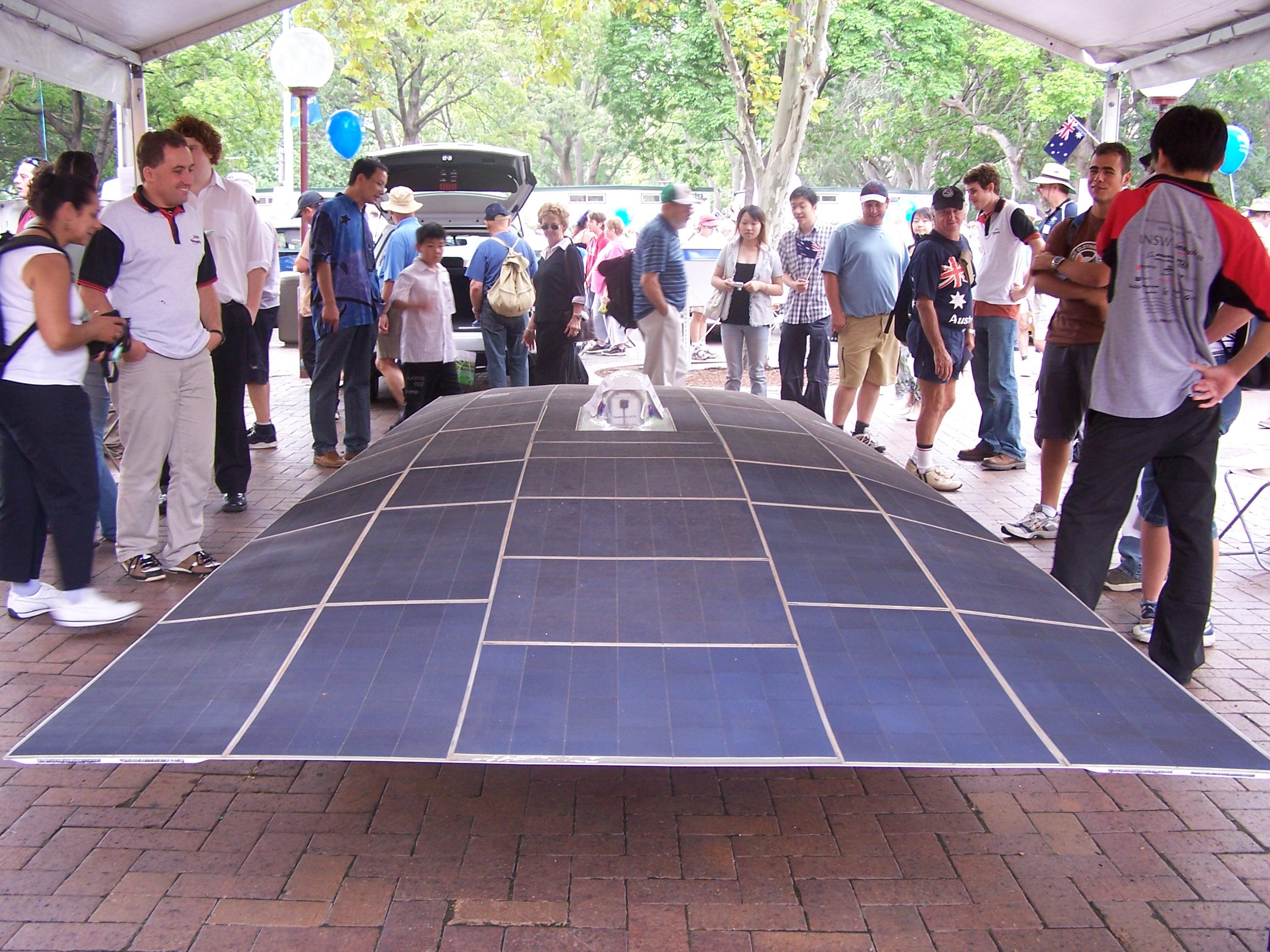
Sunswift III

Sunswift III was designed for the 2005 WSC. Mechanical problems caused a crash before the race, and the car completed the course unofficially. In 2006, the mechanics were improved. In January 2007, Jaycar Sunswift III broke the world transcontinental record, completing the drive from Perth to Sydney in 5.5 days. In September, the team completed the WSC in ninth place overall out of an initial field of 41 international entrants, and was also awarded the CSIRO technical innovation award. The same year, the Sunswift team was awarded the 2007 Engineers Australia Engineering Excellence Award for Education and Training.

Technical specifications for Sunswift III
Dimensions	Length: 6.0 metres (19.7 ft); Width: 2.0 metres (6 ft 7 in); Height: 0.9 metres (2 ft 11 in)
Solar Array	11.5-square-metre (124 sq ft) of 20% efficient solar cells Power output of 1.8 kilowatts (2.4 hp)
Chassis	Carbon fibre monoconque
Battery	2.5 kilowatt-hours
Maximum Speed	120 km/h
Weight	220 kilograms (490 lb)

== Sunswift II (1998–2005) ==
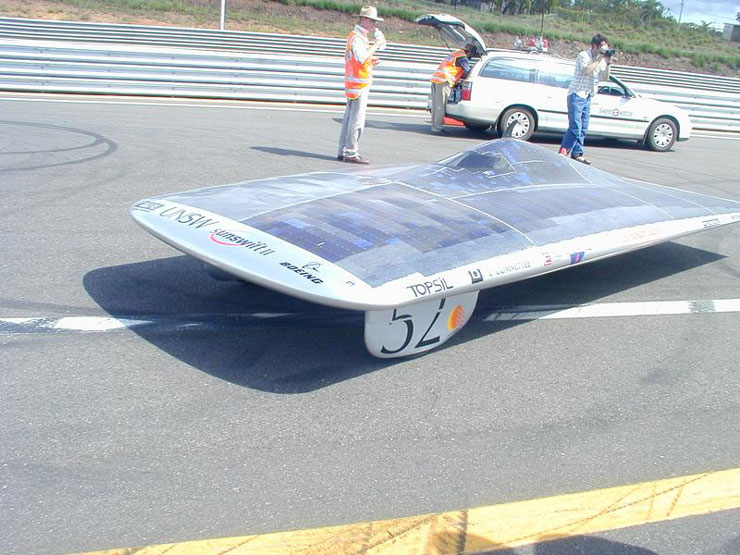
UNSW Sunswift II

Between 1997 and 2003, the team developed, refined and raced four versions of UNSW Sunswift II. In 2000–2001, the team embarked on the TopCell project to manufacture buried contact solar cells to construct a new solar array. This made the UNSW SRT the first and only team to have manufactured its own solar cells. During the project, the team achieved a new world record efficiency for this type of solar cell. The remaining cells on UNSW Sunswift II were the world's highest- efficiency "PERL" silicon solar cells at the time, made at UNSW. The team also pioneered a cell encapsulation technique which allowed the moulding of solar panels to the curved shape of the car.

Technical specifications for Sunswift II
Dimensions	Length: 4.4 metres (14 ft); Width: 2.0 metres (6 ft 7 in); Height: 0.9 metres (2 ft 11 in)
Weight	180 kilograms (400 lb)
Solar Array	8-square-metre at 19.5% efficiency BP "Saturn" cells, laminated using epoxy resins and fibreglass Power output ~1 kilowatt (1.3 hp)
Chassis	Chromoly space frame with structural carbon fibre seat
Motor	UNSW/CSIRO developed electric wheel motor Maximum output 3 kilowatts (4.0 hp)
Suspension	Aluminium double wishbone front trailing arm and rear Ohlins Motorcycle shock absorbers
Battery	102 Sony Lithium Ion Batteries; Total weight 30 kilograms (66 lb)
Battery Power	3 kilowatt-hours (11 MJ) at 20 V
Maximum Speed	120 km/h
Telemetry	Fluke Hydra data logger/radio modem

== Sunswift I (1996) ==
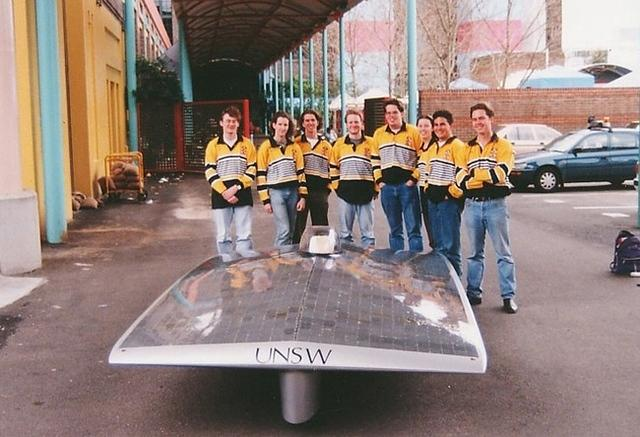
UNSW Sunswift I Solarcar with crew.

The original Sunswift vehicle was purchased from the Aurora Vehicle Association in 1996. The car, Aurora Q1, was significantly upgraded by the UNSW SRT and renamed Sunswift, under team leader Byron Kennedy. A new motor and controller, roll cage, chassis and batteries were added. Sunswift I then went on to race in the 1996 World Solar Challenge. Despite its age, the car placed 9th out of over 46 entries. The experience gained from racing Sunswift I inspired the development of Sunswift II starting in 1997.

Technical specifications for Sunswift I
Total cost	$95,000 + $200,000 for purchase of the Aurora Q1
Dimensions	Length: 4.46 metres (14.6 ft); Width: 2.0 metres (6 ft 7 in); Height: 1.01 metres (3 ft 4 in)
Weight	255 kilograms (562 lb)
Solar Cells/Array	7.88-square-metre (84.8 sq ft) permanent array (1923 cells). All cells were PERL mono (FZ) silicon with an average efficiency of 18.5%
Chassis	Aluminium rigid A-frame/glass fibre reinforced Nomex honeycomb (upper). Carbon fibre reinforced Nomex honeycomb (lower).
Motor	T-Flux TF406 permanent magnet DC, Brushless
Maximum speed	Experimental: 63 kilometres per hour (39 mph); Theoretical: 70 kilometres per hour (43 mph)
Battery	58 Gates Cyclone-G12C Pb/acid cells in series
Battery Power	3 kilowatt-hours (11 MJ) at 116 V

== Achievements ==
Year	Record
1996	World Solar Challenge – Sunswift finished 9th out of 46 entries. This was the University's first entry in a solar car event amongst the prestigious and competitive entries from Honda Motors Corporation, the Swiss entry from Biel, and Mitsubishi Materials Corporation.
1999	NRMA Transcontinental Record Attempt – with the car NRMA Sunswift II completed 4,012 kilometres (2,493 mi) in ten days, despite five days of bad weather. Even though the record of 8½ days was not broken, the attempt was still regarded to be a success with $2.4 million worth of publicity generated.
1999	CitiPower SunRace – three days after completing the Perth-Sydney record attempt the team entered this event. NRMA Sunswift II obtained third place in a highly competitive field of five entries, proving the car's reliability and the team's dedication after five continuous weeks on the road.
1999	NRMA Sunswift II participated in a trade exhibition in Taipei, on request from the Federal Government.
1999	World Solar Challenge – NRMA Sunswift II finished a respectable 18th out of 48 international entries.
2001	World Solar Challenge – UNSW Sunswift II was the 11th car to cross the line.
2002	SunRace – 2nd Place
2003	SunRace – 2nd Place
2005	World Solar Challenge – UNSW Sunswift III was the 9th car (and the first with silicon solar cells) to cross the line, arriving in 5 days.
2007	Jaycar Sunswift III broke the world record for a solar car journey from Perth to Sydney. The team finished the journey in 5.5 days, breaking the previous record by 3 days.
2007	World Solar Challenge – Jaycar Sunswift III finished 4th in the Adventure class and 9th overall at 4:11 pm on 26 October. The team was awarded with the prestigious Freescale Technical Innovation Award for the high efficiency of the vehicle.
2007	The UNSW Solar Racing Team was awarded the Engineers Australia Engineering Excellence Award, for education and training.
2009	Global Green Challenge (World Solar Evolution) – Sunswift IV finished 1st in the Silicon Challenge Class and 4th overall at 3:08 pm on 29 October.
2011	Guinness World Record: Fastest Solar Powered Vehicle: 88.8 kilometres per hour (55.2 mph)
2011	World Solar Challenge – Sunswift IVy finished 1st in the Production Challenge Class and 6th overall
2013	World Solar Challenge – Sunswift eVe Line Honours and 3rd overall in Cruiser Class, including a top speed of 128 kilometres per hour (80 mph)
2014	FIA Land Speed Record – Sunswift eVe breaks the record for the fastest electric car over 500 kilometres (310 mi), with an average speed of 107 kilometres per hour (66 mph). The previous record of 73 kilometres per hour (45 mph) was set in 1988
2015	World Solar Challenge – Sunswift eVe finished 3rd across the line and 4th overall.
2018	Guinness World Record – Lowest Energy Consumption Driving Trans-Australia (Perth to Sydney) – Electric Car
2022	Guinness World Record - Fastest 1000 km achieved by an electric car on a single charge (prototype)
2023	World Solar Challenge - Sunswift 7 finished 1st in Cruiser Class

== See also ==
- Solar car racing
- List of solar car teams
- List of prototype solar-powered cars
