= PowerCore SunCruiser =

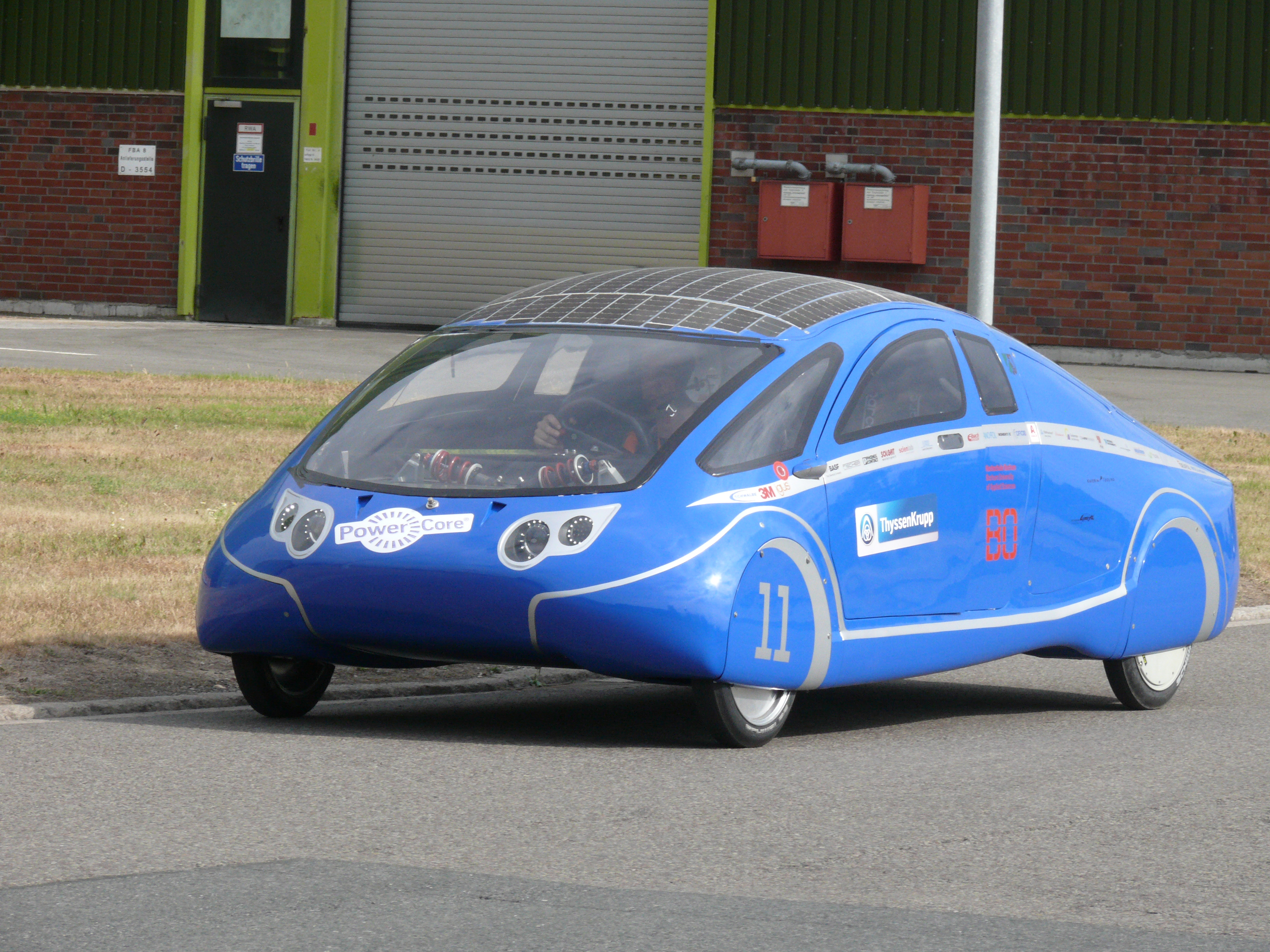

Overview
- Type: Small car
- Model years: 2013

Powertrain
- Engine: Electric motor: 2.5 kW

The PowerCore SunCruiser is a solar-powered road vehicle. It was created at the Bochum University of Applied Sciences to compete at the World Solar Challenge in 2013. The PowerCore SunCruiser is the fifth vehicle built by the University of Bochum and categorized as an EC vehicle class L7e, which includes full road approval. The car was presented to the public on 25 July 2013. It offers space for three persons, can reach a top speed of over 100 km/h, and is driven by two wheel-hub motors in the back wheels. Its maximum power is 8.5 kW. The vehicle's empty weight is around 340 kg, of which the batteries take around 63 kg.

The range on a fully charged battery in the absence of sunlight is 700 km when driven at a uniform speed of 65 km/h. Its multi-layer solar cells operate at 29.7% efficiency. The performance of the 3 square meter solar cells on the roof is 833 W.

== Batteries ==
The accumulators make use of 1316 Panasonic NCR 18650B lithium-ion batteries. For the model driven at the World Solar Challenge in 2013, the battery had a total weight of 63 kg and was able to store 15.9 kWh of energy, achieving a nominal voltage of 100.8 V.

== Solar cells ==
Tandem solar cells consisting of gallium arsenide are used. On the roof are 944 cells, which can deliver a voltage of 2.28 V and a current of 0.47 A. The maximum efficiency of a cell is 29.7 %. In order to achieve this degree of efficiency nine different MPPTs (maximum power point tracker) are used. The overall electrical performance of the array is 833W.

== Motor ==
The motor is a development of the Bochum University of Applied Sciences. The permanently excited synchronous machine develops a maximum torque of 110 Nm and a nominal torque of 16 Nm.

== Race ==
=== World Solar Challenge ===
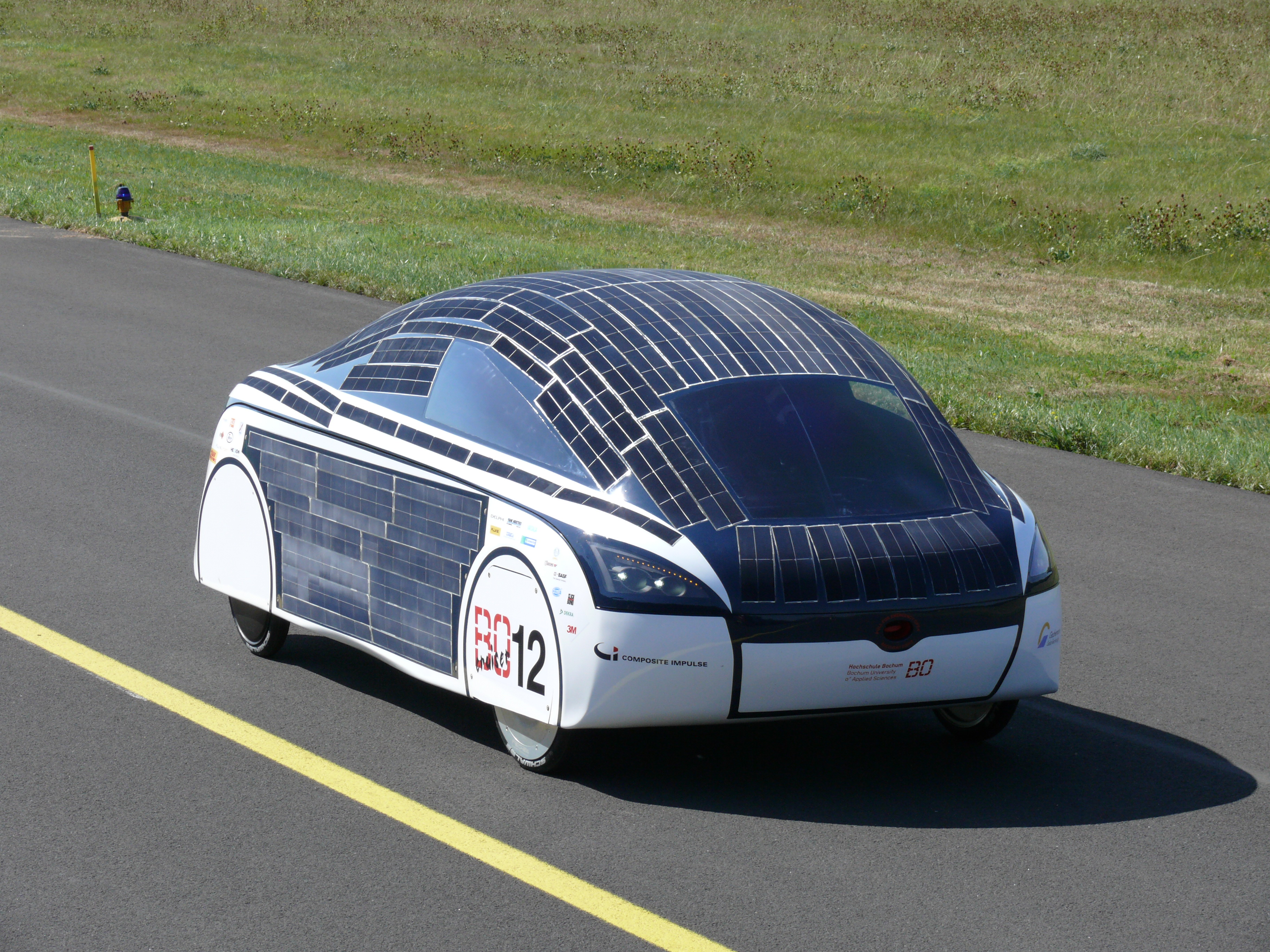
The 2009 BOcruiser prototype

The vehicle was specially built for the World Solar Challenge 2013 (WSC 2013), 6 October 2013 that took place in Australia. It started in the so-called "Cruiser-class", which, according to a progenitor model from Bochum - BOcruiser. This class segment emphasised the practicality of the vehicle as a daily commute with the development of solar energy in the focus. For the first time, a solar car from Bochum crossed the goal of 3,000 km without a glitch through the Australian Outback, and was at the end, world vice-champion. The University of Bochum reported the WSC 2013 race participation in a journal.

=== The European Solar Challenge ===
In October 2014 the PowerCore SunCruiser together with the previous model and the "Weltumrundler" SolarWorld GT took part in the MacCready Solar Challenge (ESC). This took place in Zolder, Belgium, on the former Formula 1 race track. The SunCruiser took first place and became European champion in 2014. The car won the endurance category race in about 9 hours and reached the second-fastest lap. Diary entries, pictures, galleries and videos by ESC 2014 are on the solar car web site of the University of Bochum.

== The Team ==
The racing team was made up of around 30 students, and also involved students who designed and built the vehicle. The team was sub-divided into groups having individuals specializing in different aspects of the development of the vehicle and the organizers.
