= Solar car racing =

Auto racing using solar powered vehicles

Solar car racing refers to competitive races of electric vehicles which are powered by solar energy obtained from solar panels on the surface of the car (solar cars). The first solar car race was the Tour de Sol in 1985 which led to several similar races in Europe, US and Australia. Such challenges are often entered by universities to develop their students' engineering and technological skills, but many business corporations have entered competitions in the past. A small number of high school teams participate in solar car races designed exclusively for high school students.

== Distance races ==
The two most notable solar car distance (overland) races are the World Solar Challenge and the American Solar Challenge. They are contested by a variety of university and corporate teams. Corporate teams participate in the races to give their design teams experience of working with both alternative energy sources and advanced materials. University teams participate in order to give their students experience in designing high technology cars and working with environmental and advanced materials technology. These races are often sponsored by government or educational agencies, and businesses such as Toyota keen to promote renewable energy sources.

=== Support ===
The cars require intensive support teams similar in size to professional motor racing teams. This is especially the case with the World Solar Challenge where sections of the race run through very remote country. The solar car will travel escorted by a small caravan of support cars. In a long distance race each solar car will be preceded by a lead car that can identify problems or obstacles ahead of the race car. Behind the solar car there will be a mission control vehicle from which the race pace is controlled. Here tactical decisions are made based on information from the solar car and environmental information about the weather and terrain. Behind the mission control there might be one or more other vehicles carrying replacement drivers and maintenance support as well as supplies and camping equipment for the entire team.

=== World Solar Challenge ===
This race features a field of competitors from around the world who race to cross the Australian continent. The 30th Anniversary race of the World Solar Challenge was held in October 2017. Major regulation changes were released in June 2006 for this race to increase safety, to build a new generation of solar car, which with little modification could be the basis for a practical proposition for sustainable transport and intended to slow down cars in the main event, which could easily exceed the speed limit (110 km/h) in previous years.

In 2013 the organisers of the event introduced the Cruiser Class to the World Solar Challenge, designed to encourage contestants to design a "practical" solar powered vehicle. This race requires that vehicles have four wheels and upright seating for passengers, and is judged on a number of factors including time, payload, passenger miles, and external energy use. The Dutch TU Eindhoven solar racing team were the inaugural Cruiser Class winner with their vehicle Stella.

=== American Solar Challenge ===
The American Solar Challenge, previously known as the 'North American Solar Challenge' and 'Sunrayce', features mostly collegiate teams racing in timed intervals in the United States and Canada. The annual Formula Sun Grand Prix track race is used as a qualifier for ASC.

The American Solar Challenge was sponsored in part by several small sponsors. However, funding was cut near the end of 2005, and the NASC 2007 was cancelled. The North American solar racing community worked to find a solution, bringing in Toyota as a primary sponsor for a 2008 race. Toyota has since dropped the sponsorship. The last North American Solar Challenge was run 2016, from Brecksville, OH to Hot Springs, SD. The race was won by the University of Michigan. Michigan has won the race the last 6 times it has been held.

=== The Solar Car Challenge in Texas ===
The Solar Car Challenge is an annual event held in Texas wherein groups of typically high school students construct solar cars and then race them. The Challenge was created by Dr. Lehman Marks and draws teams from across the United States, such as Puerto Rico, as well as international participants from elsewhere in North America and the Caribbean, such as those from Costa Rica or Canada.

=== South African Solar Challenge ===
The South African Solar Challenge is a biennial, two-week solar-powered car race through the length and breadth of South Africa. The first challenge in 2008 proved that this event can attract the interest of the public, and that it has the necessary international backing from the FIA. Late in September, all entrants will take off from Pretoria and make their way to Cape Town, then drive along the coast to Durban, before climbing the escarpment on their way back to the finish line in Pretoria 11 days later. The event has (in both 2008 and 2010) been endorsed by International Solarcar Federation (ISF), Fédération Internationale de l'Automobile (FIA), World Wildlife Fund (WWF) making it the first Solar Race to receive endorsement from these 3 organizations. The last race took place in 2016. Sasol confirmed their support of the South Africa Solar Challenge, by taking naming rights to the event, so that for the duration of their sponsorship, the event was known as the Sasol Solar Challenge, South Africa.

=== Carrera Solar Atacama ===
The Carrera Solar Atacama is the first solar-powered car race of its kind in Latin America; the race covers 2,600 km (1,600 mi) from Santiago to Arica in the north of Chile. The race's founder, La Ruta Solar, claims it is the most extreme of the vehicular races due to the high levels of solar radiation, up to 8.5 kWh/m^{2}/day, encountered while traversing the Atacama Desert, as well as challenging participating teams to climb 3,500 m (11,500 ft) above sea level. After the 2018 race, La Ruta Solar organized its next edition for 2020, but it never came to be. In the end of 2019, the organization struggled with funding and decided to cancel the race. A few months later they declared bankruptcy.

=== Other races ===
- [ESVC] Electric-Solar Vehicle Championship, India, an event for Junior level, Engineers and 3000 KM Solar Challenge for all India.
- Formula-G, a yearly track race in Turkey.
- Bharat Solar Challenge, a yearly track race in India.
- Suzuka, a yearly track race in Japan.
- World Green Challenge (World Solarcar Rallye / World Solar Bicycle race), a yearly track race in Japan.
- Phaethon, part of the Cultural Olympiad in Greece prior to the 2004 Olympics.
- World Solar Rally in Taiwan.

== Solar drag races ==
Solar drag races are another form of solar racing. Unlike long distance solar races, solar dragsters do not use any batteries or pre-charged energy storage devices. Racers go head-to-head over a straight quarter kilometer distance. Currently, a solar drag race is held each year on the Saturday closest to the summer solstice in Wenatchee, Washington, USA. The world record for this event is 29.5 seconds set by the South Whidbey High School team on June 23, 2007.

== Model and educational solar races ==
Solar vehicle technology can be applied on a small scale, which makes it ideal for educational purposes in the STEM areas. Some events are:

=== Model Solar Vehicle Challenge Victoria ===
The Victorian Model Solar Vehicle Challenge is an engineering competition undertaken by students across Victoria, year 1 to Year 12. Students design and construct their own vehicle, be it a car or boat. This event is currently held at ScienceWorks (Melbourne) in October each year. The first event was held in 1986. The goal of the challenge is to provide students with an experience of what it is like to work in STEM and to understand what can be achieved with renewable technology.

=== Junior Solar Sprint ===
Junior Solar Sprint was created in the 1980s by the National Renewable Energy Laboratory (NREL) to teach younger children about the importance and challenges of using renewable energy. The project also teaches students how the engineering process is applied, and how solar panels, transmission, and aerodynamics can be used in practice.

== Speed records ==
=== Fédération Internationale de l'Automobile (FIA) ===
The FIA recognise a land speed record for vehicles powered only by solar panels. The current record was set by the Solar Team Twente, of the University of Twente with their car SolUTra. The record of 37.757 km/h was set in 2005. The record takes place over a flying 1000m run, and is the average speed of 2 runs in opposite directions.

In July, 2014, a group of Australian students from the UNSW Sunswift solar racing team at the University of New South Wales broke a world record in their solar car, for the fastest electric car weighing less than 500 kilograms (1,100 lb) and capable of travelling 500 kilometres (310 mi) on a single battery charge. This particular record was overseen by the Confederation of Australian Motorsport on behalf of the FIA and is not exclusive to solar-powered cars but to any electric car, and so during the attempt, the solar panels were disconnected from the electrical systems. The previous record of 73 kilometres per hour (45 mph) - which had been set in 1988 - was broken by the team with an average speed of 107 kilometres per hour (66 mph) over the 500 kilometres (310 mi) distance.

=== Guinness world record ===
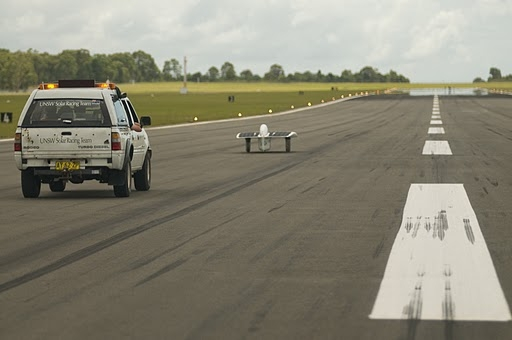
Sunswift IV and control vehicle during speed record attempts at HMAS Albatross.

Guinness World Records recognize a land speed record for vehicles powered only by solar panels. This record is currently held by the University of New South Wales with the car Sunswift IV. Its 25-kilogram (55 lb) battery was removed so the vehicle was powered only by its solar panels. The record of 88.8 kilometres per hour (55.2 mph) was set on 7 January 2011 at the naval air base HMAS Albatross in Nowra, breaking the record previously held by the General Motors car Sunraycer of 78.3 kilometres per hour (48.7 mph). The record takes place over a flying 500 metres (1,600 ft) stretch, and is the average of two runs in opposite directions.

== Miscellaneous records ==
=== Australian Transcontinental (Perth to Sydney) Speed Record ===
The Perth to Sydney Transcontinental record has held a certain allure in Solar Car Racing. Hans Tholstrup (the founder of the World Solar Challenge) first completed this journey in The Quiet Achiever in under 20 days in 1983. This vehicle is in the collection of the National Museum of Australia in Canberra.

The record was beaten by Dick Smith and the Aurora Solar Vehicle Association racing in the Aurora Q1

The current record was set in 2007 by the UNSW Solar Racing Team with their car Sunswift III mk2

== Vehicle design ==
Solar cars combine technology used in the aerospace, bicycle, alternative energy and automotive industries. Unlike most race cars, solar cars are designed with severe energy constraints imposed by the race regulations. These rules limit the energy used to only that collected from solar radiation, albeit starting with a fully charged battery pack. Some vehicle classes also allow human power input. As a result, optimizing the design to account for aerodynamic drag, vehicle weight, rolling resistance and electrical efficiency are paramount.

A usual design for today's successful vehicles is a small canopy in the middle of a curved wing-like array, entirely covered in cells, with 3 wheels. Before, the cockroach style with a smooth nose fairing into the panel was more successful. At lower speeds, with less powerful arrays, other configurations are viable and easier to construct, e.g. covering available surfaces of existing electric vehicles with solar cells or fastening solar canopies above them.

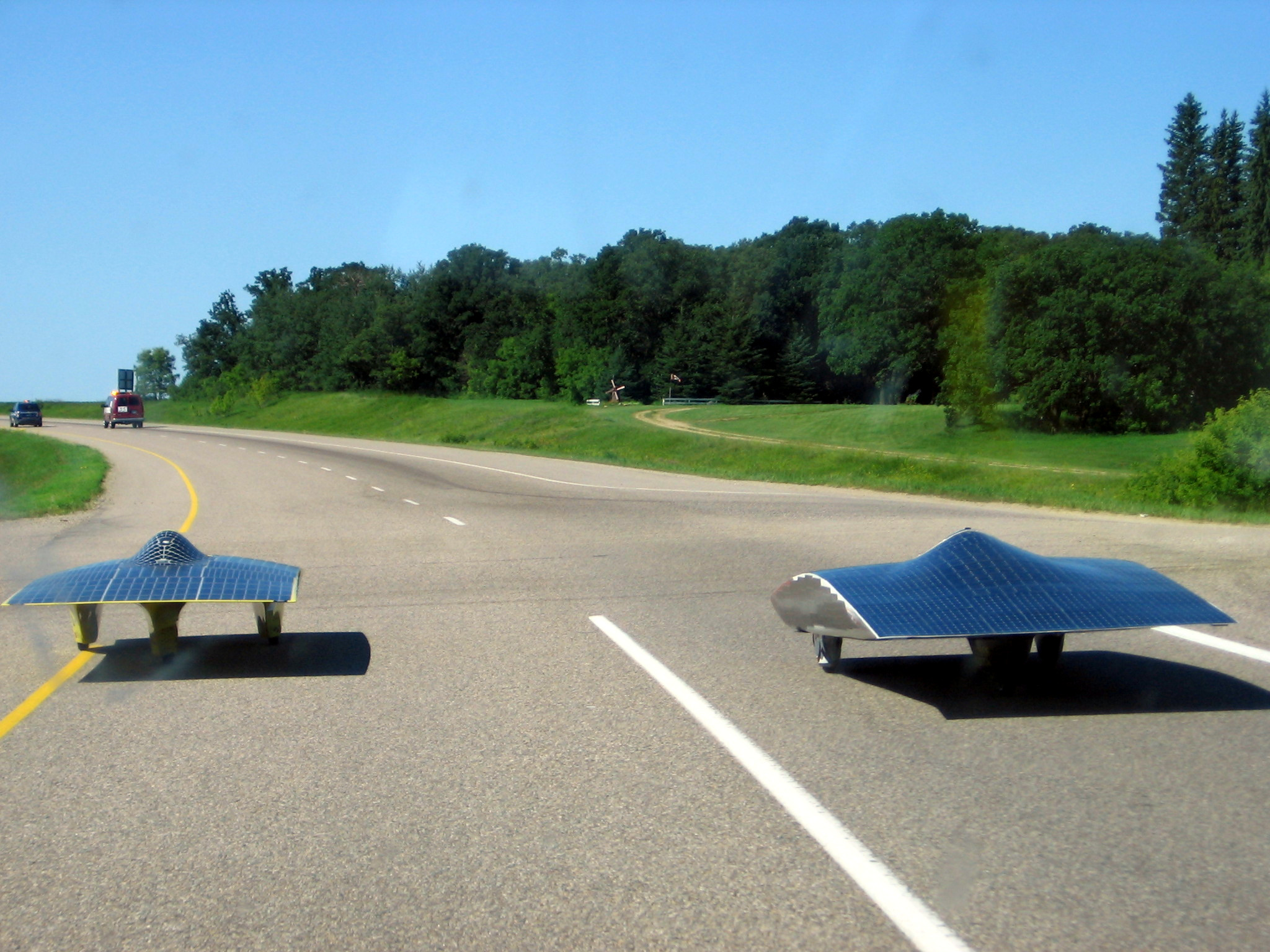
Race vehicles head toward the finish line in the 2005 North American Solar Challenge.

=== Electrical system ===
The electrical system controls all of the power entering and leaving the system. The battery pack stores surplus solar energy produced when the vehicle is stationary or travelling slowly or downhill. Solar cars use a range of batteries including lead-acid batteries, nickel-metal hydride batteries (NiMH), nickel-cadmium batteries (NiCd), lithium ion batteries and lithium polymer batteries.

Power electronics may be used to optimize the electrical system. The maximum power tracker adjusts the operating point of the solar array to the voltage that produces the most power for the given conditions, e.g. temperature. The battery manager protects the batteries from overcharging. The motor controller controls the desired motor power. Many controllers allow regenerative braking, i.e. power is fed back into the battery during deceleration.

Some solar cars have complex data acquisition systems that monitor the whole electrical system, while basic cars show battery voltage and motor current. In order to judge the range available with varying solar production and motive consumption, an ampere-hour meter multiplies battery current and rate, thus providing the remaining vehicle range at each moment in the given conditions.

A wide variety of motor types have been used. The most efficient motors exceed 98% efficiency. These are brushless three-"phase" DC, electronically commutated, wheel motors, with a Halbach array configuration for the neodymium-iron-boron magnets, and Litz wire for the windings. Cheaper alternatives are asynchronous AC or brushed DC motors.

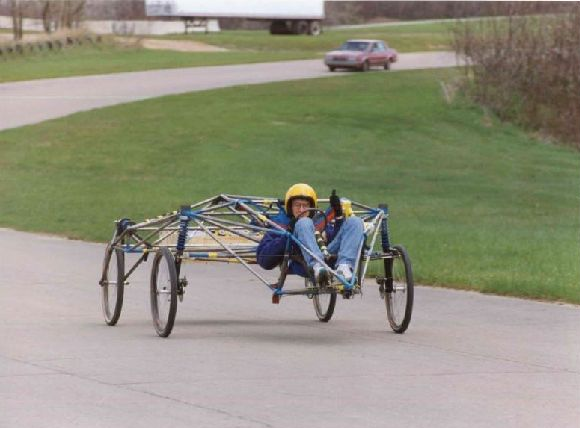
A test chassis at Ford Proving Grounds in 1992.

=== Mechanical systems ===
The mechanical systems are designed to keep friction and weight to a minimum while maintaining strength and stiffness. Designers normally use aluminium, titanium and composites to provide a structure that meets strength and stiffness requirements whilst being fairly light. Steel is used for some suspension parts on many cars.

Solar cars usually have three wheels, but some have four. Three-wheelers usually have two front wheels and one rear wheel: the front wheels steer and the rear wheel follows. Four-wheel vehicles are set up like normal cars or similarly to three-wheeled vehicles with the two rear wheels close together.

Solar cars have a wide range of suspensions because of varying bodies and chassis. The most common front suspension is the double wishbone suspension. The rear suspension is often a trailing-arm suspension as found in motorcycles.

Solar cars are required to meet rigorous standards for brakes. Disc brakes are the most commonly used due to their good braking ability and ability to adjust. Mechanical and hydraulic brakes are both widely used. The brake pads or shoes are typically designed to retract to minimize brake drag, on leading cars.

Steering systems for solar cars also vary. The major design factors for steering systems are efficiency, reliability and precision alignment to minimize tire wear and power loss. The popularity of solar car racing has led to some tire manufacturers designing tires for solar vehicles. This has increased overall safety and performance.

All the top teams now use wheel motors, eliminating belt or chain drives.

Testing is essential to demonstrating vehicle reliability prior to a race. It is easy to spend a hundred thousand dollars to gain a two-hour advantage, and equally easy to lose two hours due to reliability issues.

=== Solar array ===
The solar array consists of hundreds (or thousands) of photovoltaic solar cells converting sunlight into electricity. Cars can use a variety of solar cell technologies; most often polycrystalline silicon, mono-crystalline silicon, or gallium arsenide. The cells are wired together into strings while strings are often wired together to form a panel. Panels normally have voltages close to the nominal battery voltage. The main aim is to get as much cell area in as small a space as possible. Designers encapsulate the cells to protect them from the weather and breakage.

Designing a solar array is more than just stringing a bunch of cells together. A solar array acts like many very small batteries all hooked together in series. The total voltage produced is the sum of all cell voltages. The problem is that if a single cell is in shadow it acts like a diode, blocking the current for the entire string of cells. To design against this, array designers use by-pass diodes in parallel with smaller segments of the string of cells, allowing current around the non-functioning cell(s). Another consideration is that the battery itself can force current backward through the array unless there are blocking diodes put at the end of each panel.

The power produced by the solar array depends on the weather conditions, the position of the sun and the capacity of the array. At noon on a bright day, a good array can produce over 2 kilowatts (2.6 hp). A 6 m^{2} array of 20% cells will produce roughly 6 kW·h (22 kJ) of energy during a typical day on the WSC.

Some cars have employed free-standing or integrated sails to harness wind energy. Races including the WSC and ASC, consider wind energy to be solar energy, so their race regulations allow this practice.

=== Aerodynamics ===
Aerodynamic drag is the main source of losses on a solar race car. The aerodynamic drag of a vehicle is the product of the frontal area and its C_{d}. For most solar cars the frontal area is 0.75 to 1.3 m^{2}. While C_{d} as low as 0.10 have been reported, 0.13 is more typical. This needs a great deal of attention to detail.

=== Mass ===
The vehicle's mass is also a significant factor. A light vehicle generates less rolling resistance and will need smaller lighter brakes and other suspension components. This is the virtuous circle when designing lightweight vehicles.

=== Rolling resistance ===
Rolling resistance can be minimized by using the right tires, inflated to the right pressure, correctly aligned, and by minimizing the weight of the vehicle.

=== Performance equation ===
The design of a solar car is governed by the following work equation:

$\eta \left\{\eta_bE + \frac{Px}{v}\right\} = \left\{W C_{rr1} + N C_{rr2} v + \frac{1}{2}\rho C_d A v^2\right\}x +Wh + \frac{N_a W v^2}{2g}$

which can be usefully simplified to the performance equation

$$\eta \left\{\eta_bEv/x + P\right\} = \left\{W C_{rr1} v + \frac{1}{2}\rho C_d A v^3\right\}$$

for long-distance races, and values seen in practice.

Briefly, the left-hand side represents the energy input into the car (batteries and power from the sun) and the right-hand side is the energy needed to drive the car along the race route (overcoming rolling resistance, aerodynamic drag, going uphill and accelerating). Everything in this equation can be estimated except v. The parameters include:

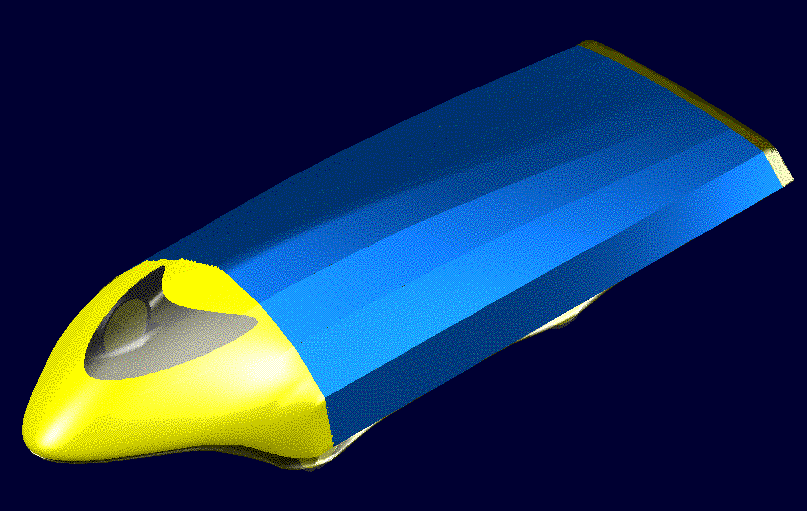
Computer simulation of a solar car body design.

Symbol	Description	Ford Australia	Aurora	Aurora	Aurora
	Year	1987	1993	1999	2007
η	Motor, controller and drive train efficiency (decimal)	0.82	0.80	0.97	0.97
η_{b}	Watt-hour battery efficiency (decimal)	0.82	0.92	0.82	1.00 (LiPoly)
E	Energy available in the batteries (joules)	1.2e7	1.8e7	1.8e7	1.8e7
P	Estimated average power from the array (1) (watts)	918	902	1050	972
x	Race route distance (meters)	3e6	3.007e6	3.007e6	3.007e6
W	Weight of the vehicle including payload (newtons)	2690	2950	3000	2400
C_{rr1}	First coefficient of rolling resistance (non-dimensional)	0.0060	0.0050	0.0027	0.0027
C_{rr2}	Second coefficient of rolling resistance (newton-seconds per meter)	0	0	0	0
N	Number of wheels on the vehicle (integer)	4	3	3	3
ρ	Air density (kilograms per cubic meter)	1.22	1.22	1.22	1.22
C_{d}	Coefficient of drag (non-dimensional)	0.26	0.133	0.10	0.10
A	Frontal area (square meters)	0.70	0.75	0.75	0.76
h	Total height that the vehicle will climb (meters)	0	0	0	0
N_{a}	Number of times the vehicle will accelerate in a race day (integer)	4	4	4	4
g	Local acceleration due to gravity variable (meters per second squared)	9.81	9.81	9.81	9.81
v	Calculated average velocity over the route (meters per second)	16.8	20.3	27.2	27.1
	Calculated average speed in km/h	60.5	73.1	97.9	97.6
	Actual race speed km/h	44.8	70.1	73	85

Note 1 For the WSC the average panel power can be approximated as (7/9)×nominal power.

Solving the long form of the equation for velocity results in a large equation (approximately 100 terms). Using the power equation as the arbiter, vehicle designers can compare various car designs and evaluate the comparative performance over a given route. Combined with CAE and systems modeling, the power equation can be a useful tool in solar car design.

=== Race route considerations ===
The directional orientation of a solar car race route affects the apparent position of the sun in the sky during a race day, which in turn affects the energy input to the vehicle.

- In a south-to-north race route alignment, for example, the sun would rise over the driver's right shoulder and finish over the left (due to the east-west apparent motion of the sun).
- In an east-west race route alignment, the sun would rise behind the vehicle, and appear to move in the direction of the vehicle's movement, setting in the front of the car.
- A hybrid route alignment includes significant sections of south-north and east-west routes together.

This is significant to designers, who seek to maximize energy input to a panel of solar cells (often called an "array" of cells) by designing the array to point directly toward the sun for as long as possible during the race day. Thus, a south-north race car designer might increase the car's total energy input by using solar cells on the sides of the vehicle where the sun will strike them (or by creating a convex array coaxial with the vehicle's movement). In contrast, an east-west race alignment might reduce the benefit from having cells on the side of the vehicle, and thus might encourage design of a flat array.

Because solar cars are often purpose-built, and because arrays do not usually move in relation to the rest of the vehicle (with notable exceptions), this race-route-driven, flat-panel versus convex design compromise is one of the most significant decisions that a solar car designer must make.

For example, the 1990 and 1993 Sunrayce USA events were won by vehicles with significantly convex arrays, corresponding to the south-north race alignments; by 1997, however, most cars in that event had flat arrays to match the change to an east-west route.

== Race strategy ==
=== Energy consumption ===
Optimizing energy consumption is of prime importance in a solar car race. Therefore, it is useful to be able to continually monitor and optimize the vehicle's energy parameters. Given the variable conditions, most teams have race speed optimization programs that continuously update the team on how fast the vehicle should be traveling. Some teams employ telemetry that relays vehicle performance data to a following support vehicle, which can provide the vehicle's driver with an optimum strategy.

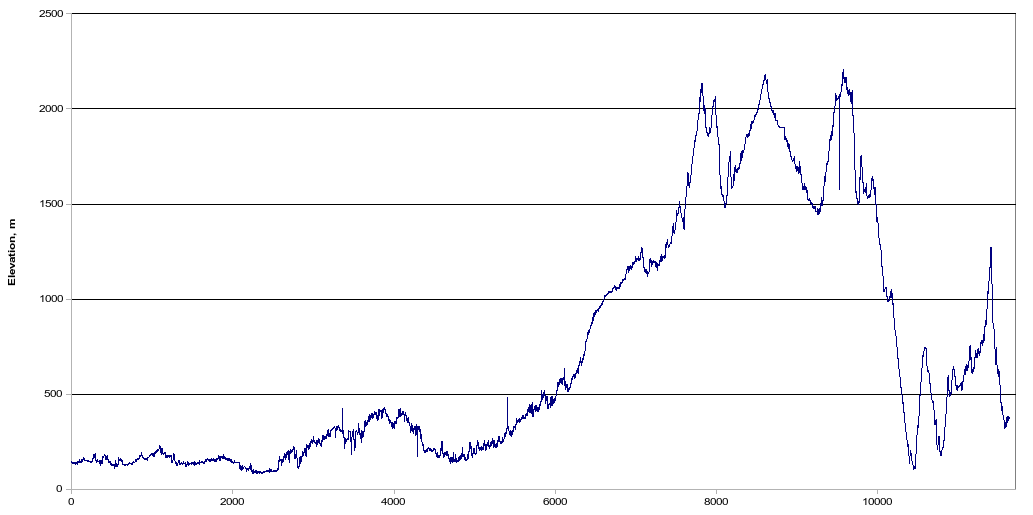
Elevation (in meters) of a race route that crossed the Rocky Mountains, from Illinois to California.

=== Race route ===
The race route itself will affect strategy, because the apparent position of the sun in the sky will vary depending on various factors which are specific to the vehicle's orientation (see "Race Route Considerations," above).

In addition, elevation changes over a race route can dramatically change the amount of power needed to travel the route. For example, the 2001 and 2003 North American Solar Challenge route crossed the Rocky Mountains (see graph at right).

=== Weather forecasting ===
A successful solar car racing team will need to have access to reliable weather forecasts in order to predict the power input to the vehicle from the sun during each race day.

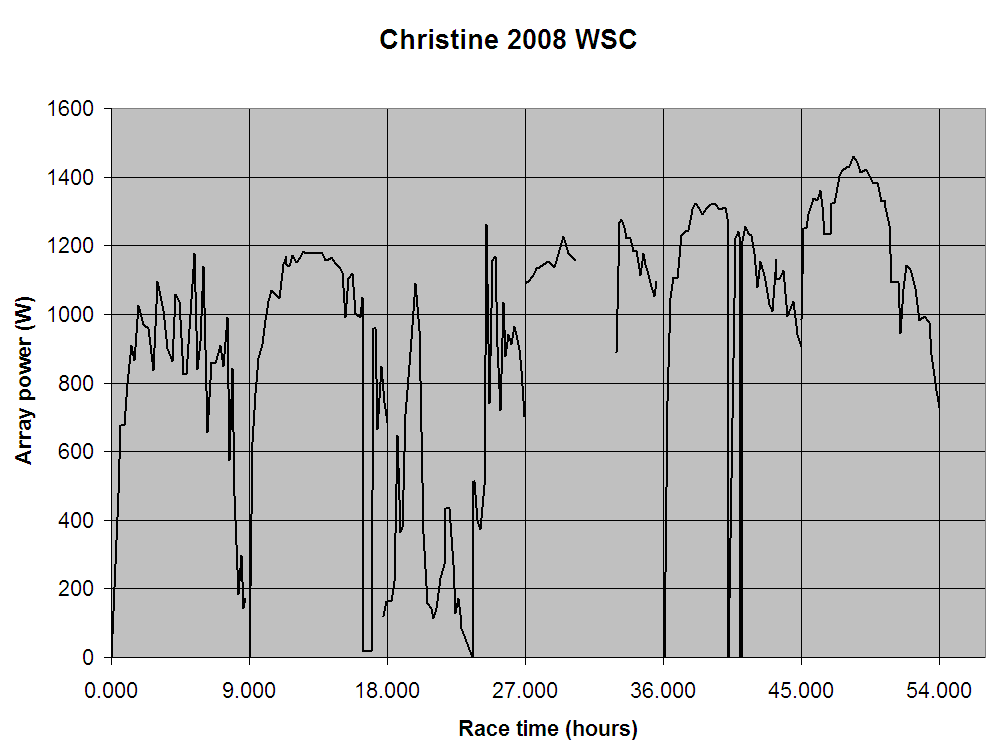
Measured array power for Aurora's Christine in the 2008 WSC.

== See also ==
- List of solar car teams
- Race the Sun
- South African Solar Challenge
- Tour de Sol
- Hunt-Winston School Solar Car Challenge
- The Quiet Achiever, the world's first solar-powered racecar
- American Solar Challenge
