= Solar bus =

Bus powered by solar energy

Solar roof on a double-decker bus

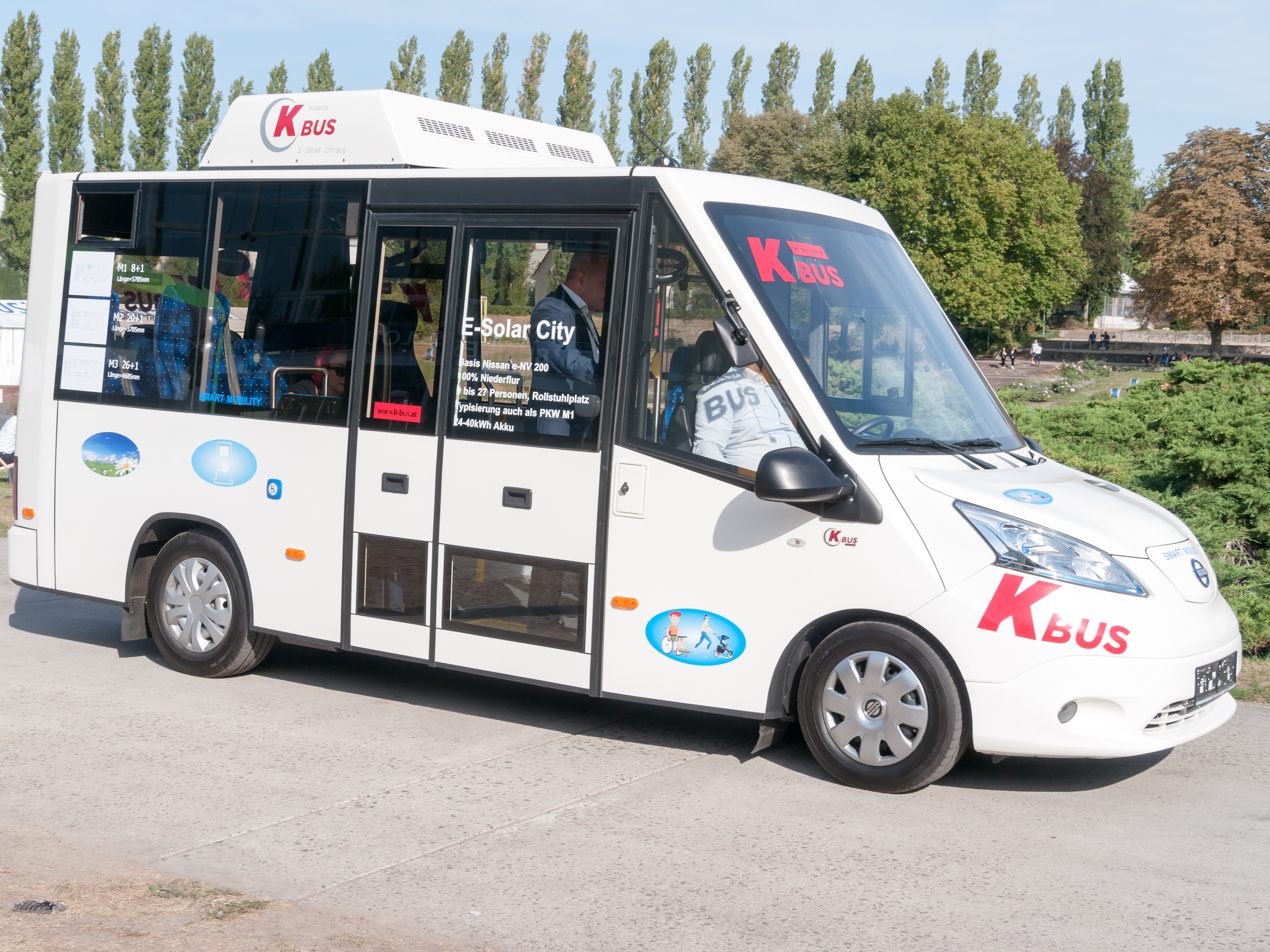
Solar-powered minibus in Berlin, Germany

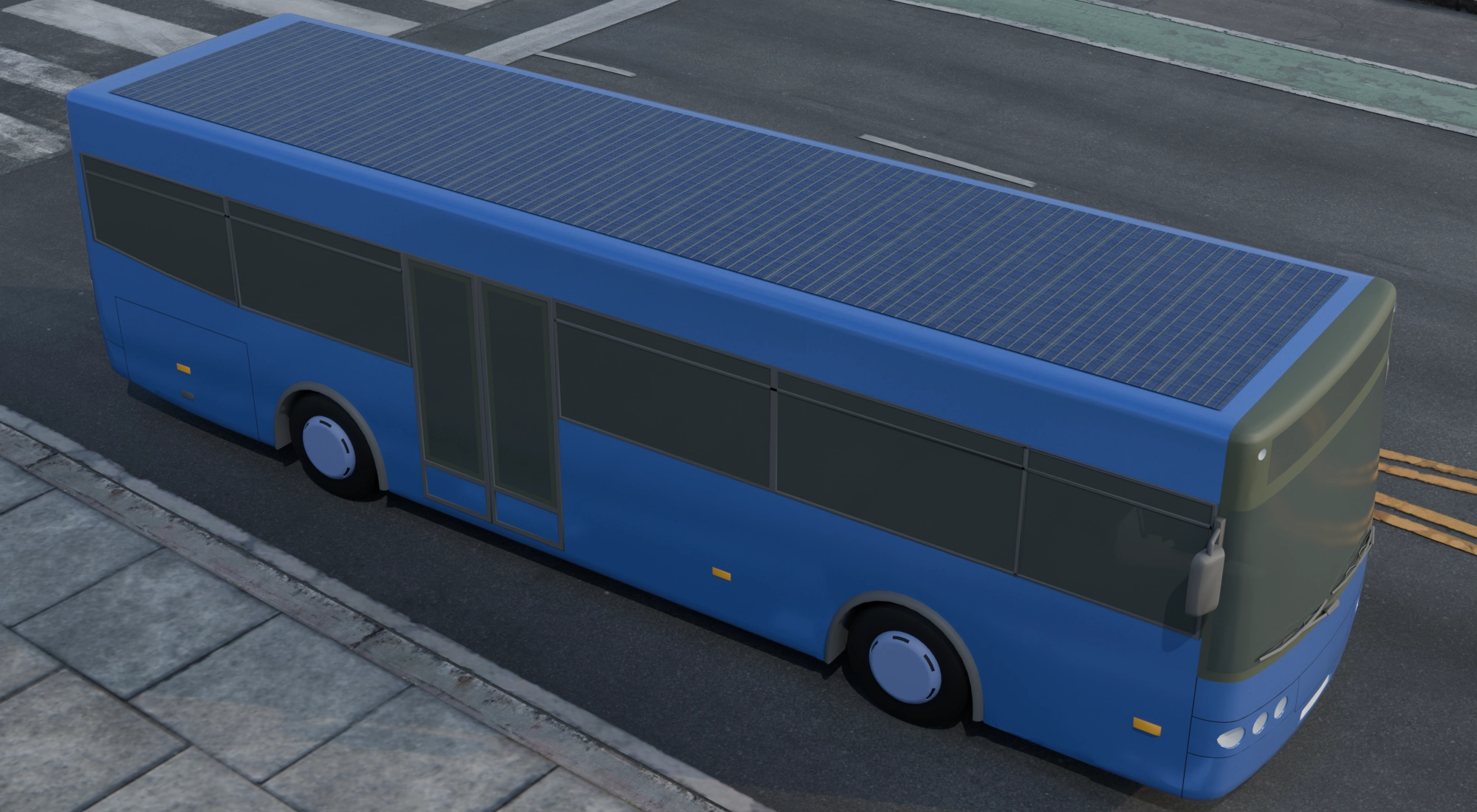
3D design of a solar bus

A solar bus or solar-charged bus is a bus that is powered exclusively or mainly by solar energy. Solar-powered bus service is referred to as a solar bus service. The use of the term "solar bus" normally implies that solar energy is used not only for powering electric equipment on the bus, but also for the propulsion of the vehicle.

Existing solar buses are battery-electric buses or (in the case of hybrid solar buses) hybrid buses equipped with batteries that are recharged from solar (or other) power sources; a launch of solar bus service often goes hand in hand with investments for large-scale installations of stationary solar panels with photovoltaic cells. Similarly, like other solar vehicles, many solar buses have photovoltaic cells contained in solar panels on the vehicle's roof which converts the sun's energy directly into electric energy to be used by the motor.

The introduction of solar buses and other green vehicles for purposes of public transport forms a part of sustainable transport schemes.

== About ==
=== Solar-only and solar-electric bus services ===
The distinction between a solar-only electric bus and an electro-solar bus is fluid, as the distinction depends on the actual usage: whether the bus is recharged from solar or other power sources.

Solar-only bus services involve recharging the bus from solar energy, usually from solar panel-covered bus station canopies. The concept is similar to that of solar parking plot for cars and bicycles, where vehicles can re-charge while parked. The need for recharging poses constraints on the run and standstill times of the bus. The implementation of a solar bus service benefits from the optimization of overall requirements for the specific bus service.

Electro-solar buses are powered additionally from electric power transmitted from power plants; hybrid solar buses may be equipped with hybrid engines.

=== Commercially available shuttle buses ===
Open-air low-speed electric shuttle sightseeing buses equipped with a solar panel-covered roof are produced in series and are commercially available. According to the producers, solar panels save energy and prolong the battery life cycle.

== Use ==
=== Australia ===
The Tindo solar battery-charged bus ("Tindo", Kaurna word for sun) is an experimental battery electric vehicle that operates in Adelaide, Australia. It is the world's first solar bus, operating since 2007. It uses 100% solar power, is equipped with a regenerative braking system and air conditioning and can carry up to 40 persons, 25 of whom are seated. The bus itself is not equipped with solar panels. It receives electric power from a photovoltaic system on Adelaide's central bus station. Hailed as the world's first bus service powered exclusively by solar power, the bus service connects Adelaide City and North Adelaide as part of Adelaide City's sustainable transport agenda. The Tindo is part of the 98A and 98C bus service (until recently known as the Adelaide Connector) which is offered as free public transport.

=== China ===
Within the Chinese government's program for the clean transport sector, China's first solar hybrid buses were put in operation in July 2012 in the city of Qiqihar. Its engine is powered by lithium-ion batteries which are fed by solar panels installed on the bus roof. It is claimed that each bus consumes 0.6 to 0.7 kilowatt-hours of electricity per kilometre and can transport up to 100 persons and that the use of solar panels prolongs the batteries' lifetime by 35 per cent.

=== Europe ===
Austria's first solar-powered bus was put in operation in the village of Perchtoldsdorf. Its powertrain, operating strategy, and design specification were specifically optimized given its planned regular service routes. It has been in trial operation since autumn 2011.

The tribrid bus is a hybrid electric bus developed by the University of Glamorgan, Wales, for use as student transport between the university's different campuses. It is powered by hydrogen fuel or solar cells, batteries and ultracapacitors.

=== India ===
In March 2020, Energy Swaraj — An Essence of Sustainability, a program conducted by All India Council for Technical Education (AICTE) was launched, led by Indian Institute of Technology (IIT) Professor Chetan Singh Solanki. The group travelled to 25 cities aboard a solar bus built by Chetan Singh Solanki to promote the benefits and practicality of using solar energy. The bus had 3.2 kW solar panels and 6 kWh of battery storage.

=== UK ===
The first Solar Bus in the UK was launched in Brighton in April 2017. Following a marathon six week effort from hundreds of local people, The Big Lemon and Brighton Energy Coop's joint Solar Bus project has won funding from the M&S Community Energy Fund to cover the roof of The Big Lemon’s bus depot in solar panels to power the new electric buses on clean green renewable energy. The bus was named "Om Shanti", by one of the Solar Roof partners, Viper IT Solutions.

The 120 solar panels will generate 30,000kWh per year of electricity – the equivalent of 1.8 million boiled kettles. With no emissions, the Solar Buses will reduce noxious gases in some of Brighton and Hove's most polluted areas and will power the 52 route between Woodingdean and Brighton on 100% renewable energy.

The Solar Bus project was one of 199 different applications to the scheme, 125 of which were shortlisted. These were put to public vote for six weeks during September and October and the voting process also included the option to donate to the project via the Crowdfunding platform.

The Solar Bus project was one of 19 regional winners, with 1549 votes, 170 pledges, and a total of £13,325 raised through crowdfunding, almost half the total amount of £28,798 raised through the scheme nationally. The project will benefit from £12,500 funding from M&S Energy which, together with the £13,325 crowdfunding donations will fund the solar array on the roof of the bus depot.

=== Uganda ===
The Kayoola Solar Bus is a 35-seater electric solar bus with zero tailpipe emissions, a range of 80 km, with latent range extension from the real-time charging enabled by the roof-mounted solar panels. The development of the Kayoola Solar Bus Concept represents the commitment of the Kiira Motors Project to championing the progressive development of local capacity for Vehicle Technology Innovation, a key ingredient for institutionalizing a sustainable Vehicle Manufacturing Industry in Uganda.

=== United States ===
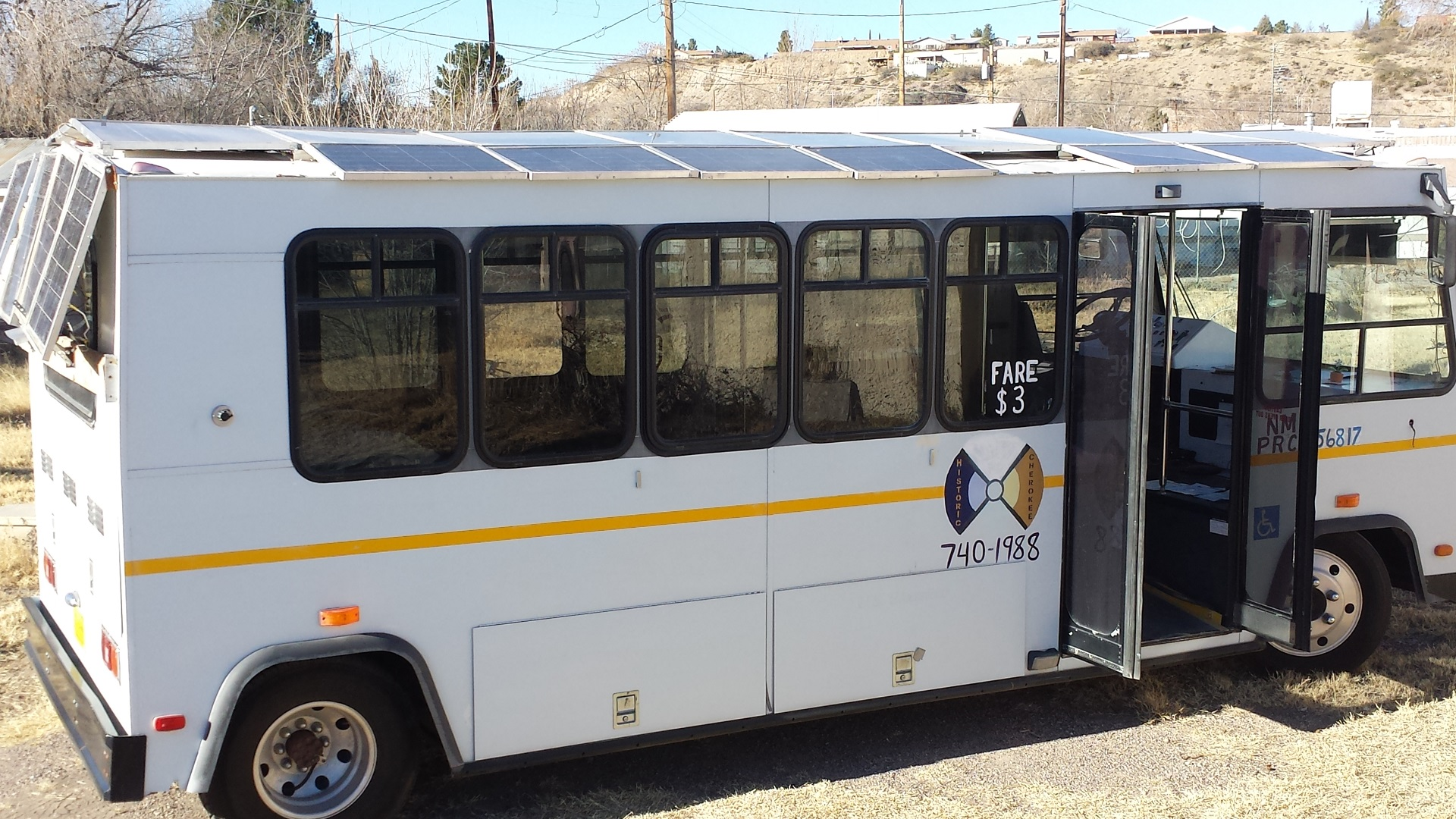
The Solar Buzz in 2015

The Solar Buzz is a 14-seater US Electrical bus, made in 1994, that has been repurposed as the world's first truly solar bus in Truth or Consequences, New Mexico in 2011. The Buzz has 2 KW in homemade solar panels on the roof, 40 golf cart batteries, 2 electric motors, and has no tailpipe. The power required to go one mile is the same as the power required to make a pot of coffee: around 700 Wh. The Solar Buzz is an IntraCity bus approved by the state Public Regulation Commission (#56817) in 2015 and is a commercial daytime private shuttle service with a US$3 Fare, operated by Hot Springs Transit, LLC. Hot Springs Transit provides transit service to the 6100 person population of Truth or Consequences.

== Other forms of green bus transport ==
=== Non-solar powered engines ===
Solar panels are also used for powering electronic devices of the bus such as heating and air conditioning, even in buses with the non-solar-powered engine. Such buses are advertised to meet anti-idling regulations in several states in the US.

Refitting existing vehicles with photovoltaic panels that feed the original battery with additional electric power has been shown to have the potential for contributing to CO_{2} emission mitigation and to the reduction of pollution. The thus transformed buses are however not solar in the strict sense of the word, as they do not use solar energy for propulsion. The use of buses in public transport implies frequent stops with the opening and closing of doors, which influence the way the energy of the battery is used.

=== Renewable energy powered ===
In principle, also trolleybuses or other non-autonomous electric buses or alternately powered buses such as fuel cell buses or dual-mode buses could be used for solar bus services, provided the origin of all or most of the energy used for proposing the bus would be solar energy. In practice, however, such systems also draw on other sources of energy, at least also other renewable energy sources such as wind energy. An example is that the city of Hamburg, Germany, received the 2011 European Green Capital Award for, among others, its fuel cell bus service that is claimed to be the world's largest hydrogen-powered bus fleet and is intended to use hydrogen generated from solar and wind energy.

== See also ==
- Solar-charged vehicle
- Hybrid electric bus
- Plug-in hybrid
- List of buses
