= Solar vehicle =

Electric vehicle powered by solar energy

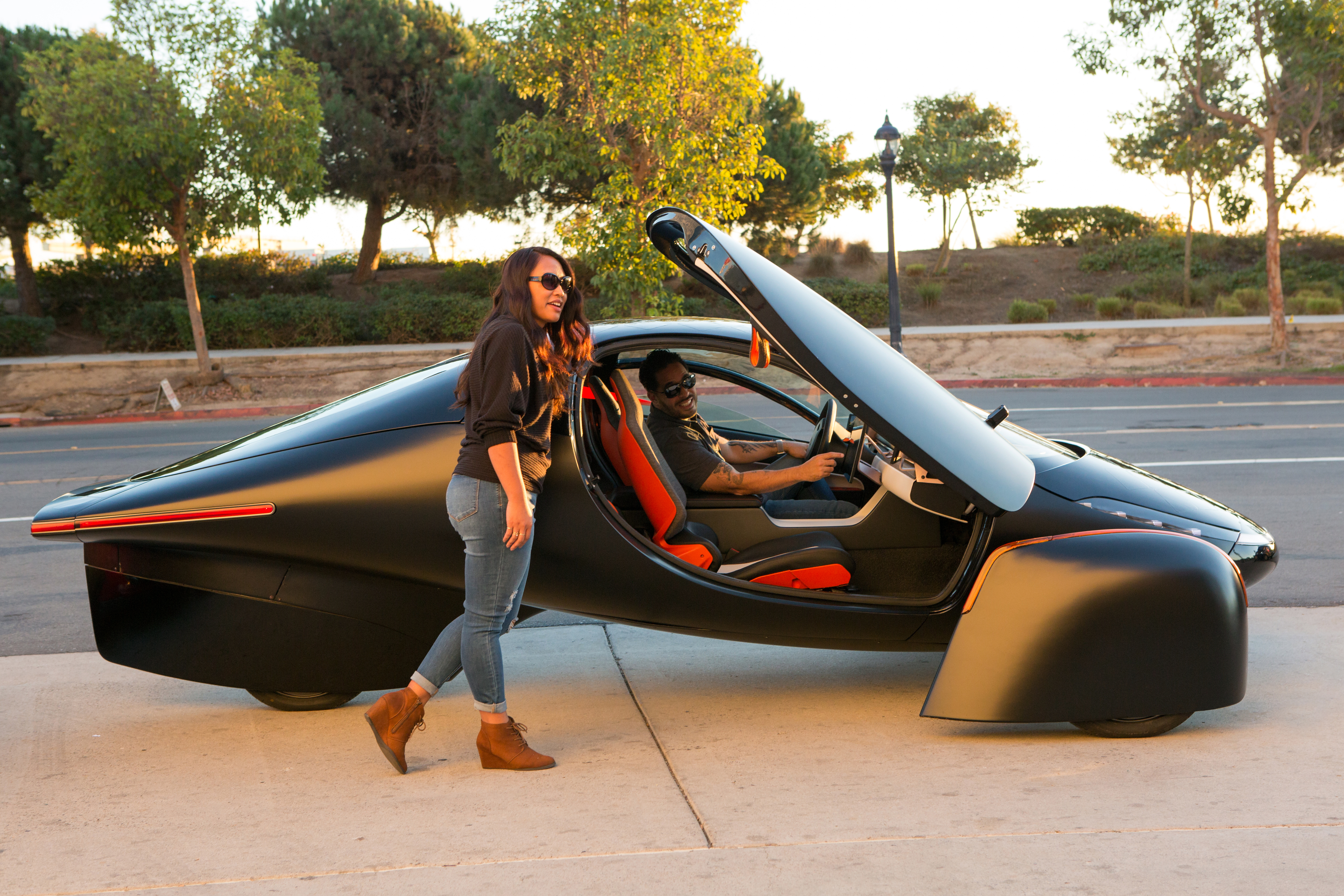
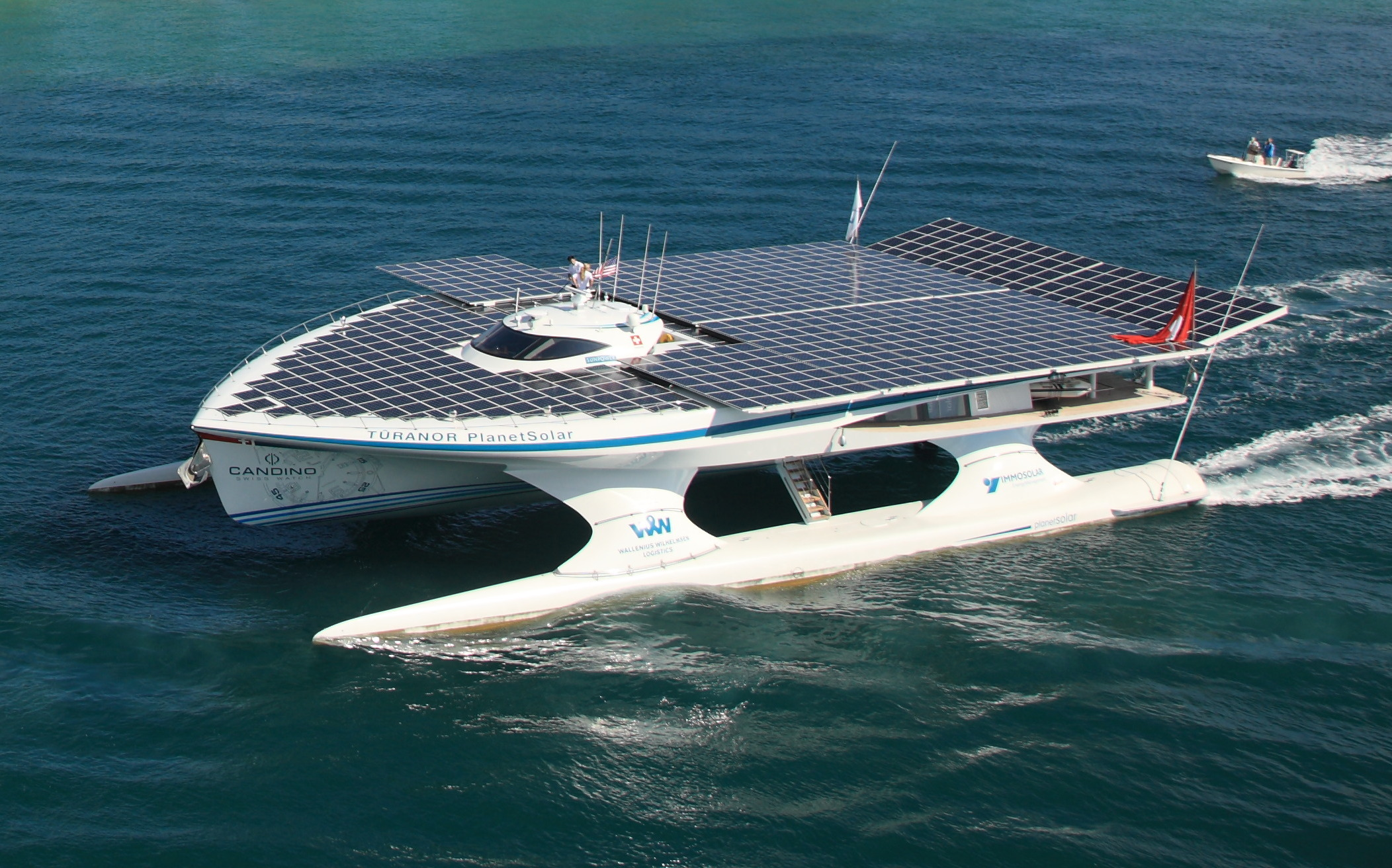
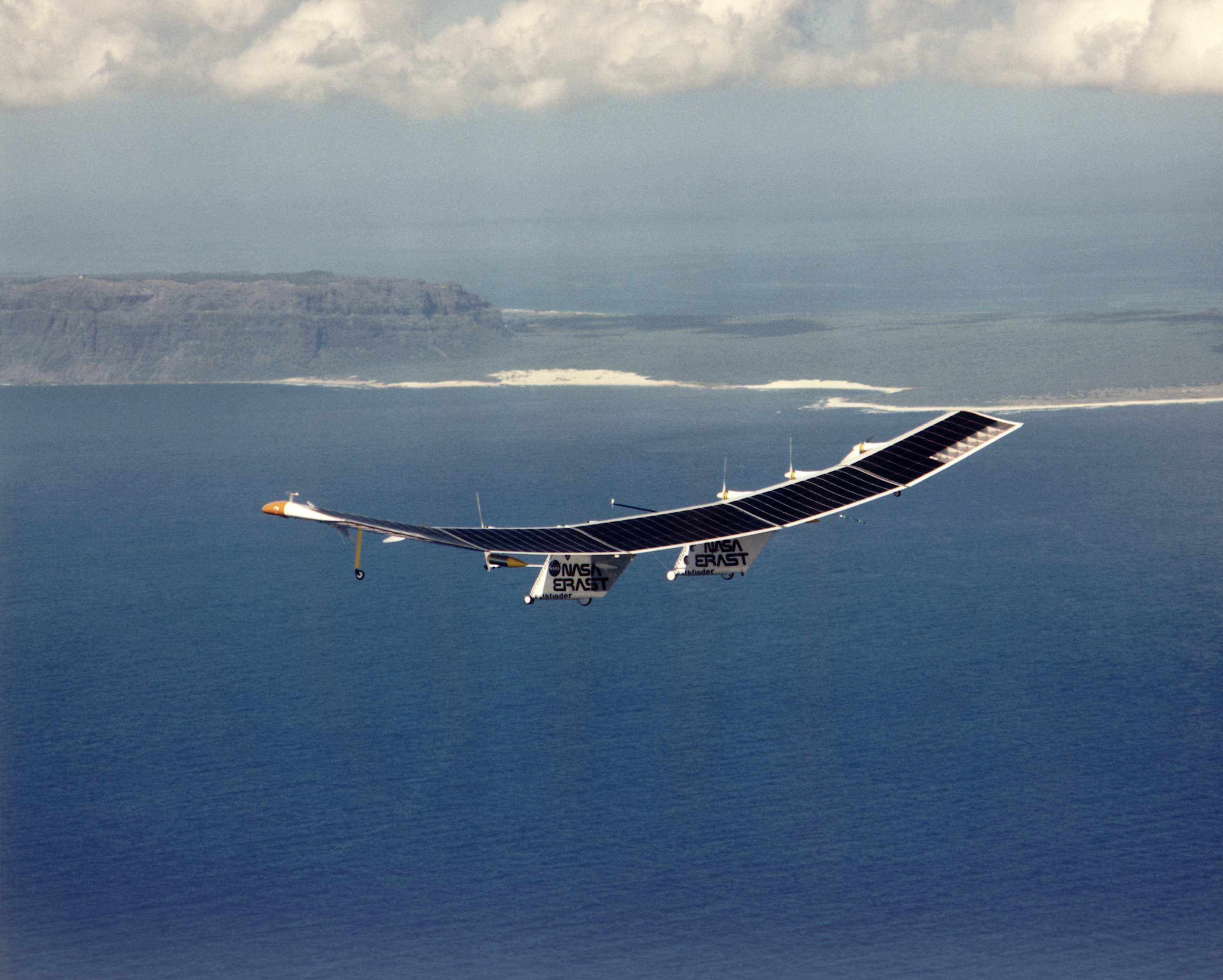
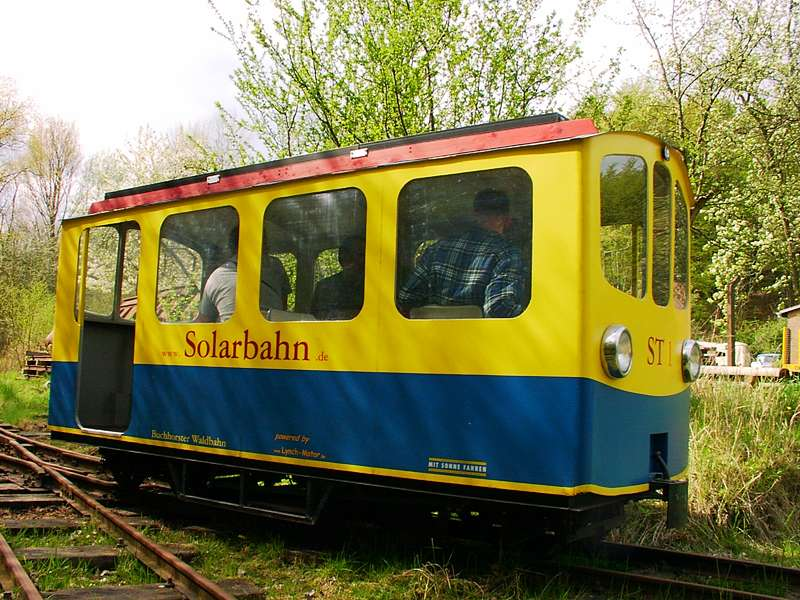
Solar vehicles around the world (left to right, from top):
- Prototype of Aptera, a solar electric vehicle, California
- PlanetSolar, first solar electric vehicle to circumnavigate the globe
- NASA Pathfinder, solar powered unmanned aerial vehicle, Hawaii
- ELSE first solar electric railway, Hamburg

A solar electric vehicle is an electric vehicle powered completely or significantly by direct solar energy. Usually, photovoltaic (PV) cells contained in solar panels convert the sun's energy directly into electric energy.

A concentrated solar vehicle uses stored solar energy to run a heat engine, such as Rankine, Stirling or Brayton cycle, of the piston and crank type directly powering the vehicle or a free-piston linear generator powering a hybrid electric car system.

The term "solar vehicle" usually implies that solar energy is used to power all or part of a vehicle's propulsion. Solar power may also be used to provide power for communications or controls or other auxiliary functions.

Solar vehicles are not sold as practical day-to-day transportation devices at present, but are primarily demonstration vehicles and engineering exercises, often sponsored by government agencies. However, indirectly solar-charged vehicles are widespread and solar boats are available commercially.

== Land ==
=== Solar cars ===
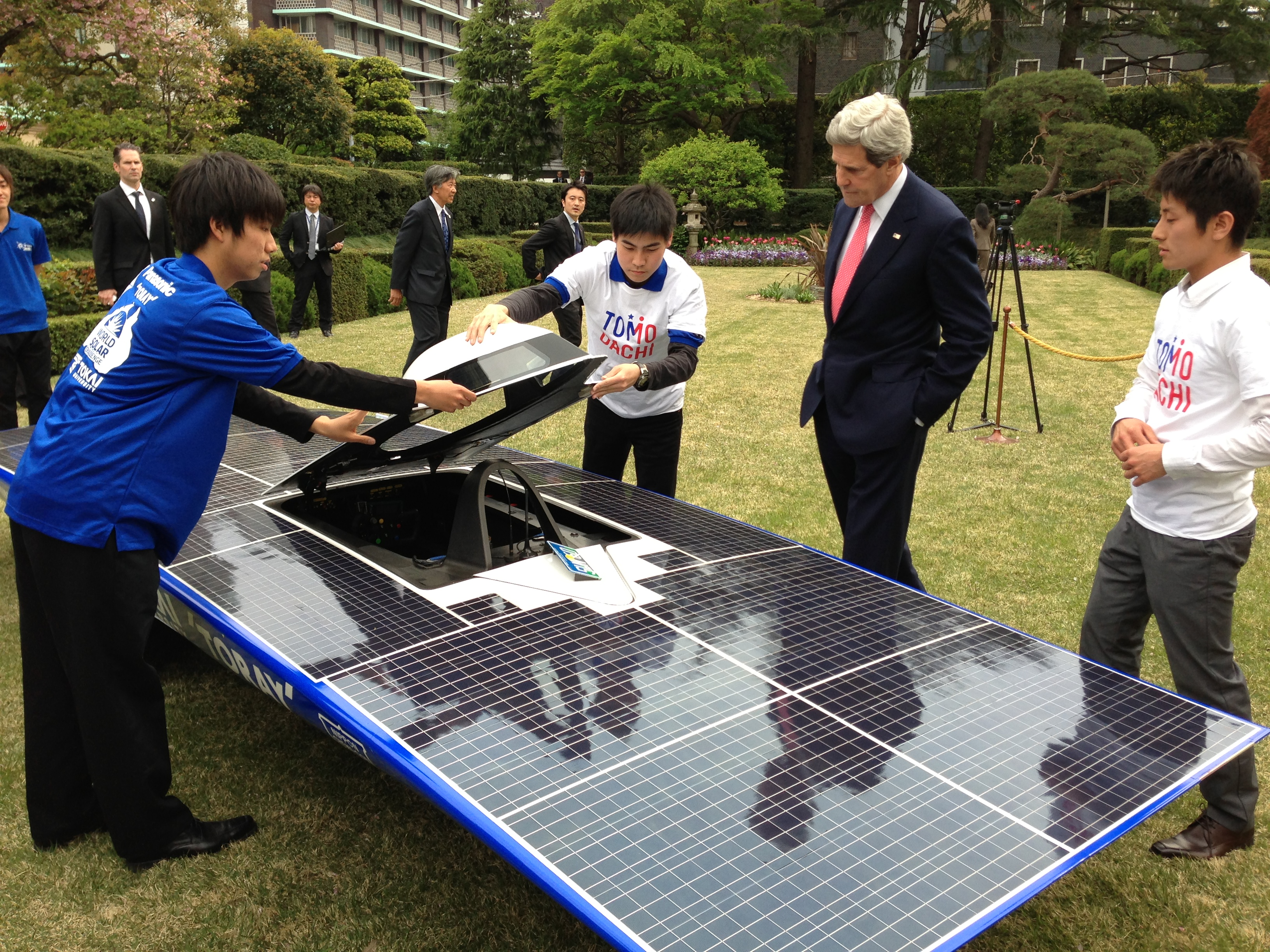
U.S. Secretary of State John Kerry examines a solar-powered car built by members of the Tomodachi Initiative youth engagement program in Tokyo, Japan, on 14 April 2013.

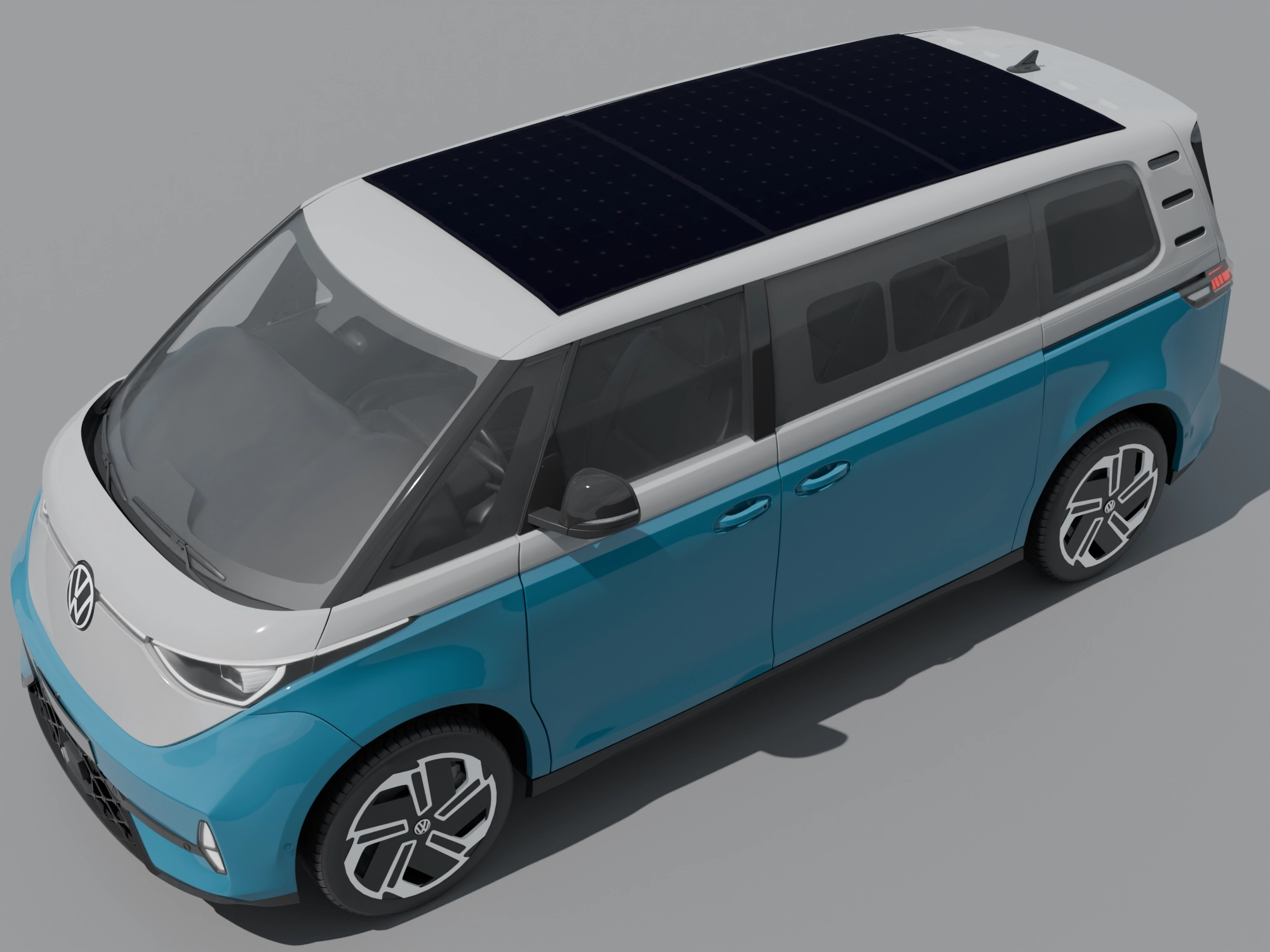
3D design of the Volkswagen ID. Buzz with a solar roof

Solar cars are electric cars that use photovoltaic (PV) cells to convert sunlight into electrical power to charge the car's battery and to power the car's electric motors.

Solar cars have been designed for solar car races and for public use. Solar vehicles must be light and efficient to get the best range from their limited captured power. 1,400 kg (3,000 lb) pound or even 1,000 kg (2,000 lb) vehicles would be less practical because the limited solar power would not take them as far. Most student-built solar cars lack the safety and convenience features of conventional vehicles and are thus not street legal.

The first solar family car, Stella, was built in 2013 by students in the Netherlands. This vehicle is capable of 890 km (550 mi) on one charge during sunlight. It weighs 390 kg (850 lb) and has a 1.5 kWh solar array.

Stella Lux, the successor to Stella, broke a record with a 1,500 km (932 mi) single-charge range. During racing Stella Lux is capable of 1,100 km (700 mi) during daylight. At 72 km/h (45 mph) Stella Lux has infinite range. This is again due to high efficiency including a Coefficient of drag of 0.16.

The average family who never drive more than 320 km (200 mi) a day would never need to charge from the mains. They would only plug in if they wanted to return energy to the grid.

Solar race cars are often fitted with gauges and/or wireless telemetry, to carefully monitor the car's energy consumption, solar energy capture and other parameters. Wireless telemetry is typically preferred as it frees the driver to concentrate on driving, which can be dangerous in such a car without safety features. The Solar Electric Vehicle system was designed and engineered as an easy to install (2 to 3 hours) integrated accessory system with a custom molded low profile solar module, supplemental battery pack and charge controlling system.

Some of the students that built Stella Lux founded a company, Lightyear, to commercialize this technology.

An American company, Aptera Motors, has also been founded to make efficient solar electric cars for the public. As of January 2023, first customer availability is expected in 2024.

In Germany the company Sono Motors was working on a solar electric vehicle, the Sono Motors Sion, that was supposed to be on the market in 2023. However in February 2023, Sono Motors terminated the Sion program and announced it would focus exclusively on being a Solar Tech Company.

Note that all battery-powered electric vehicles may also use external solar array sourced electricity to recharge. Such arrays may also be connected to the general electrical distribution grid.

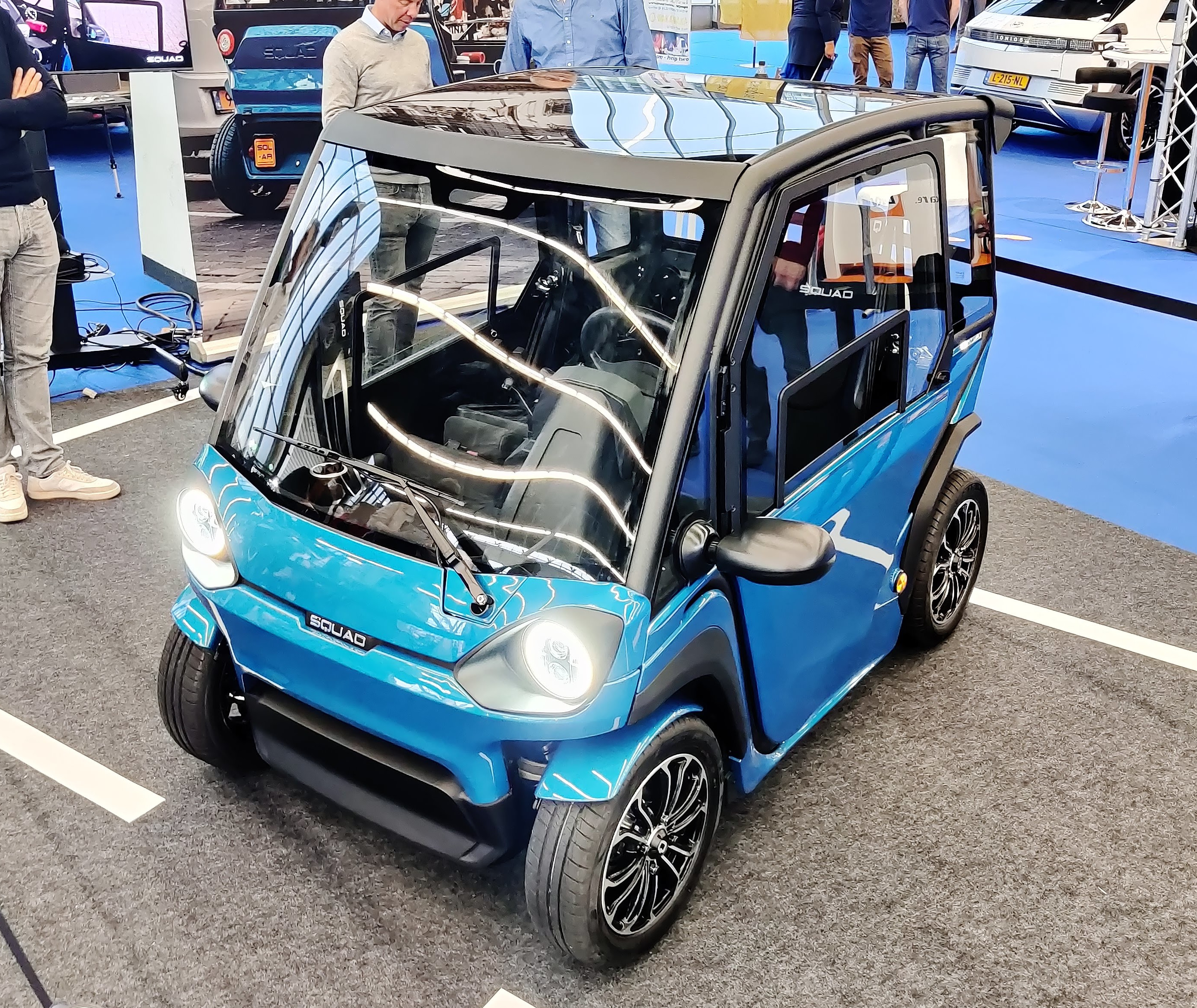
Squad Solar neighborhood Electric Vehicle

Squad Solar is a neighborhood Electric Vehicle Side-by-side with a solar roof and can be charged relatively quickly from a normal outlet.

=== Solar buses ===
Solar roof on a double-decker bus

Solar buses are propulsed by solar energy, all or part of which is collected from stationary solar panel installations. The Tindo bus is a 100% solar bus that operates as free public transport service in Adelaide City as an initiative of the City Council. Bus services which use electric buses that are partially powered by solar panels installed on the bus roof, intended to reduce energy consumption and to prolong the life cycle of the rechargeable battery of the electric bus, have been put in place in China.

Solar buses are to be distinguished from conventional buses in which electric functions of the bus such as lighting, heating or air-conditioning, but not the propulsion itself, are fed by solar energy. Such systems are more widespread as they allow bus companies to meet specific regulations, for example the anti-idling laws that are in force in several of the US states, and can be retrofitted to existing vehicle batteries without changing the conventional engine.

=== Solar semi trailers ===
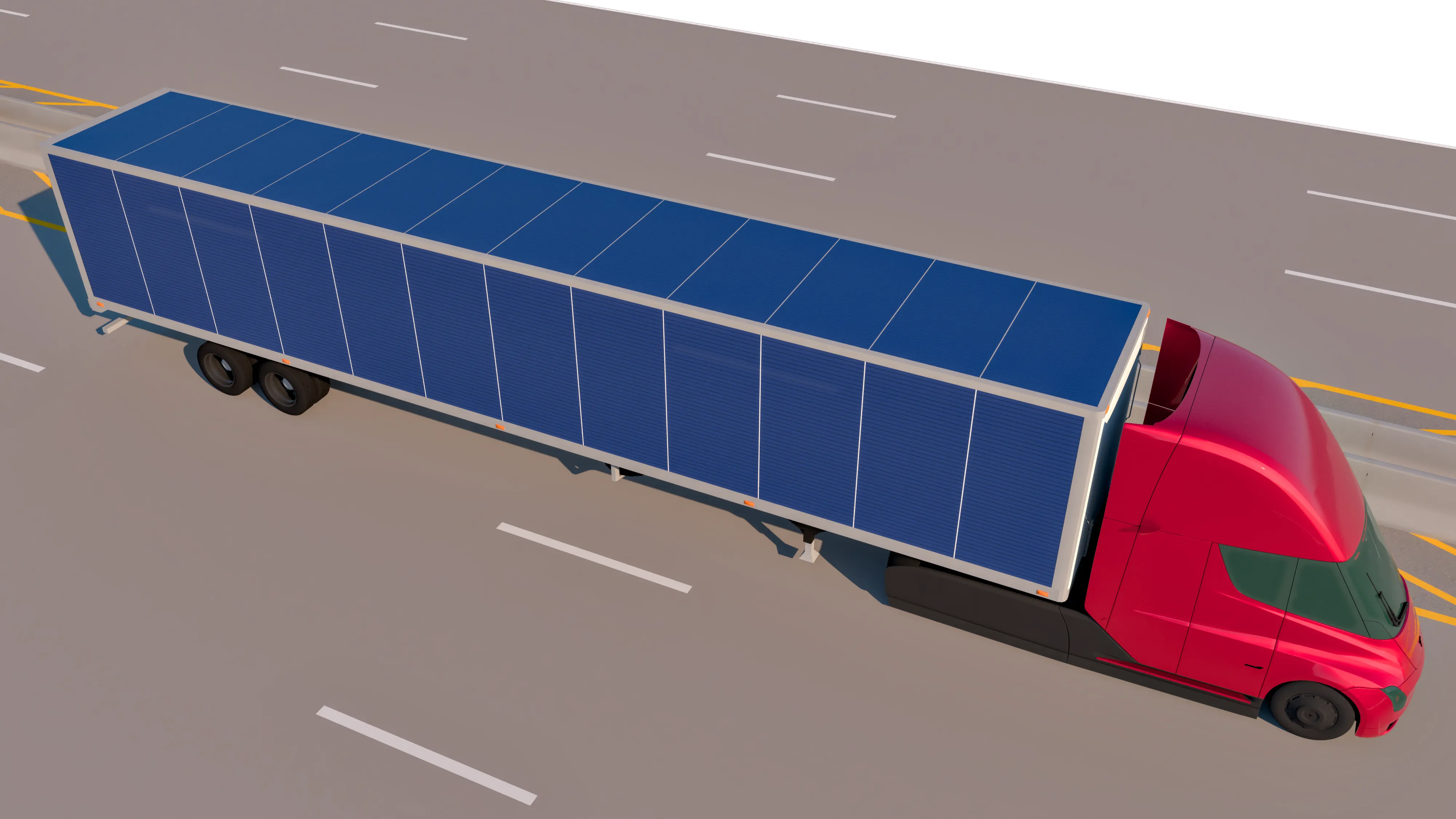
Tesla semi solar trailer 3D sketch. ~15KW of solar installation potential.

Solar panels on semi trailers has been tested. There is over 100 square meters or over 1,000 square feet of surface area for solar on a 53 foot box trailer, on the top and sides.

=== Single-track vehicles ===
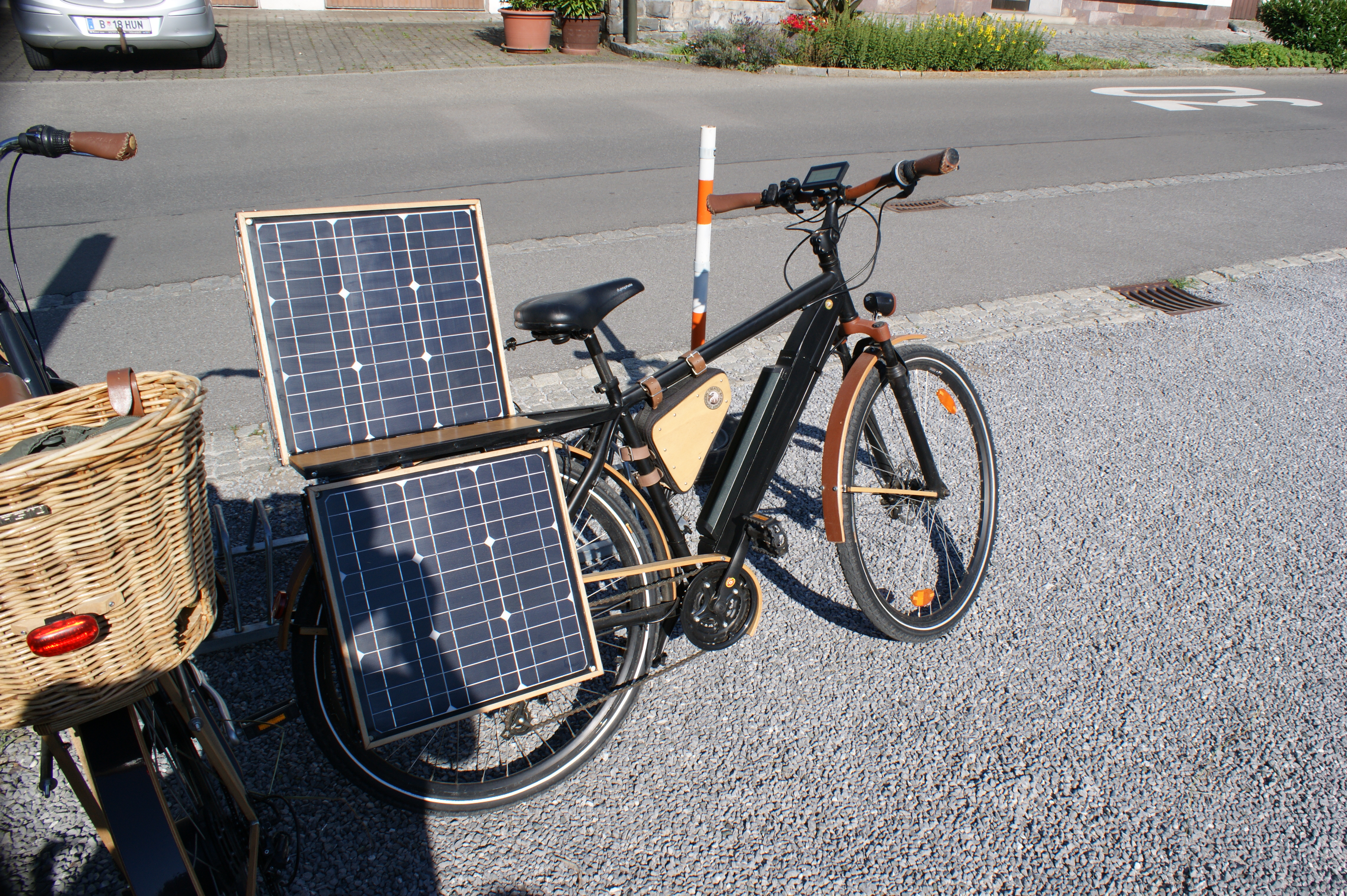
Solar bicycle in Wolfurt, Vorarlberg, Austria (2020)

The first solar "cars" were actually tricycles or Quadracycles built with bicycle technology. These were called solarmobiles at the first solar race, the Tour de Sol in Switzerland in 1985. With 72 participants, half used solar power exclusively while the other half used solar-human-powered hybrids. A few true solar bicycles were built, either with a large solar roof, a small rear panel, or a trailer with a solar panel.

Later more practical solar bicycles were built with foldable panels to be set up only during parking. Even later the panels were left at home, feeding into the electric mains, and the bicycles charged from the mains. Today highly developed electric bicycles are available and these use so little power that it costs little to buy the equivalent amount of solar electricity. The "solar" has evolved from actual hardware to an indirect accounting system. The same system also works for electric motorcycles, which were also first developed for the Tour de Sol.

=== Applications ===
The Venturi Astrolab in 2006 was the world's first commercial electro-solar hybrid car, and was originally due to be released in January 2008.

In May 2007 a partnership of Canadian companies led by Hymotion altered a Toyota Prius to use solar cells to generate up to 240 watts of electrical power in full sunshine. This is reported as permitting up to 15 km extra range on a sunny summer day while using only the electric motors.

An inventor from Michigan, USA built a street legal, licensed, insured, solar charged electric scooter in 2005. It had a top speed controlled at a bit over 30 mph, and used fold-out solar panels to charge the batteries while parked.

=== Auxiliary power ===
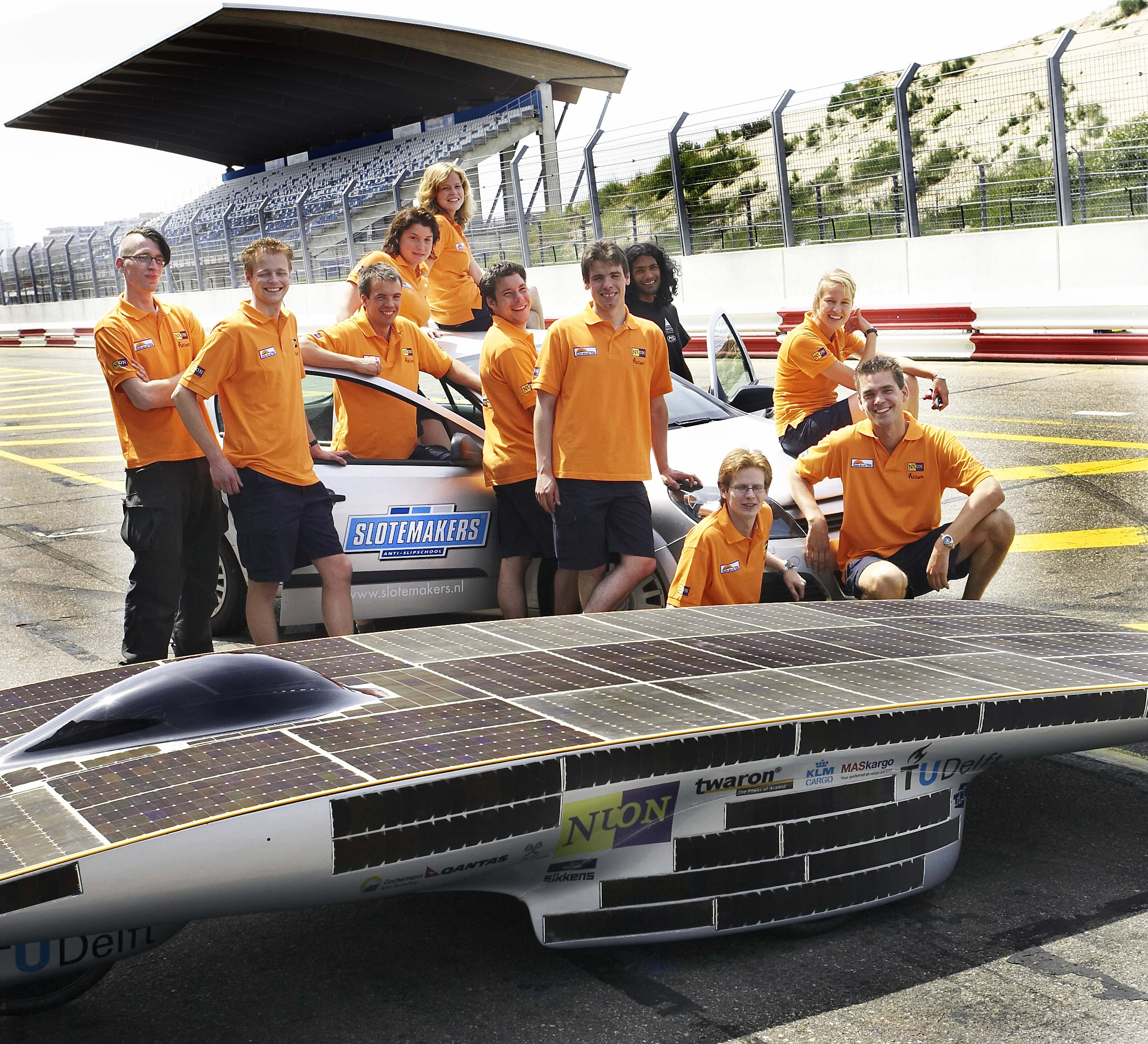
Nuna 3 PV powered car

Photovoltaic modules are used commercially as auxiliary power units on passenger cars to ventilate the car, reducing the temperature of the passenger compartment while it is parked in the sun. Vehicles such as the 2010 Prius, Aptera 2, Audi A8, and Mazda 929 have had solar sunroof options for ventilation purposes.

The area of photovoltaic modules required to power a car with conventional design is too large to be carried on board. A prototype car and trailer has been built called Solar Taxi. According to the website, it is capable of 100 km/day using 6 m^{2} of standard crystalline silicon cells. Electricity is stored using a nickel/salt battery. A stationary system such as a rooftop solar panel, however, can be used to charge conventional electric vehicles.

It is also possible to use solar panels to extend the range of a hybrid or electric car, as incorporated in the Fisker Karma, available as an option on the Chevy Volt, on the hood and roof of "Destiny 2000" modifications of Pontiac Fieros, Italdesign Quaranta, Free Drive EV Solar Bug, and numerous other electric vehicles, both concept and production. In May 2007 a partnership of Canadian companies led by Hymotion added PV cells to a Toyota Prius to extend the range. SEV claims 32 km (20 mi) per day from their combined 215 Wh module mounted on the car roof and an additional 3 kWh battery.

On 9 June 2008, the German and French presidents announced a plan to offer a credit of 6–8 g/km of CO_{2} emissions for cars fitted with technologies "not yet taken into consideration during the standard measuring cycle of the emissions of a car". This has given rise to speculation that photovoltaic panels might be widely adopted on autos in the near future.

It is also technically possible to use photovoltaic technology, (specifically thermophotovoltaic (TPV) technology) to provide motive power for a car. Fuel is used to heat an emitter. The infrared radiation generated is converted to electricity by a low band gap PV cell (e.g. GaSb). A prototype TPV hybrid car was even built. The "Viking 29" was the World's first thermophotovoltaic (TPV) powered automobile, designed and built by the Vehicle Research Institute (VRI) at Western Washington University. Efficiency would need to be increased and cost decreased to make TPV competitive with fuel cells or internal combustion engines.

=== Personal rapid transit ===
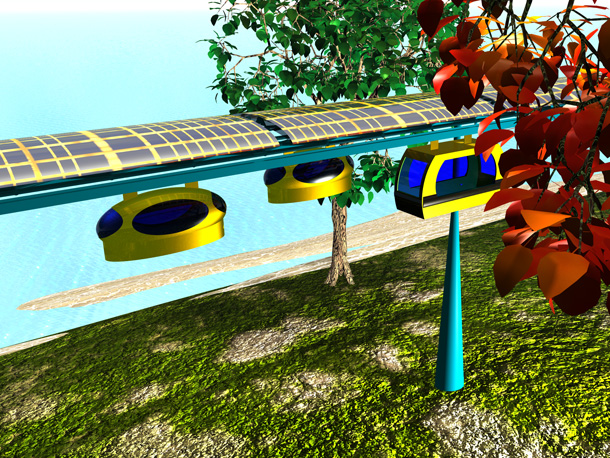
JPods PRT concept with photovoltaic panels above guideways

Several personal rapid transit (PRT) concepts incorporate photovoltaic panels.

=== Rail ===
Railways present a low rolling resistance option that would be beneficial for planned journeys and stops. PV panels were tested as APUs on Italian rolling stock under EU project PVTRAIN. Direct feed to a DC grid avoids losses through DC to AC conversion. DC grids are only to be found in electric powered transport: railways, trams and trolleybuses. Conversion of DC from PV panels to grid alternating current (AC) was estimated to cause around 3% of the electricity to be wasted.

PVTrain concluded that the most interest for PV in rail transport was on freight cars where on-board electrical power would allow new functionality:

- GPS or other positioning devices, so as to improve its use in fleet management and efficiency.
- Electric locks, a video monitor and remote control system for cars with sliding doors, so as to reduce the risk of robbery for valuable goods.
- ABS brakes, which would raise the maximum velocity of freight cars to 160 km/h, improving productivity.

The Kismaros – Királyrét narrow-gauge line near Budapest has built a solar powered railcar called 'Vili'. With a maximum speed of 25 km/h, 'Vili' is driven by two 7 kW motors capable of regenerative braking and powered by 9.9m2 of PV panels. Electricity is stored in on-board batteries. In addition to on-board solar panels, there is the possibility to use stationary (off-board) panels to generate electricity specifically for use in transport.

A few pilot projects have also been built in the framework of the "Heliotram" project, such as the tram depots in Hannover Leinhausen and Geneva (Bachet de Pesay). The 150 kW_{p} Geneva site injected 600 V DC directly into the tram/trolleybus electricity network provided about 1% of the electricity used by the Geneva transport network at its opening in 1999. On 16 December 2017 a fully solar-powered train was launched in New South Wales, Australia. The train is powered using onboard solar panels and onboard rechargeable batteries. It holds a capacity for 100 seated passengers for a 3 km journey.

Recently Imperial College London and the environmental charity 10:10 have announced the Renewable Traction Power project to investigate using track-side solar panels to power trains. Meanwhile, Indian railways announced their intention to use on-board PV to run air conditioning systems in railway coaches. Also, Indian Railways announced it is to conduct a trial run by the end of May 2016. It hopes that an average of 90,800 liters of diesel per train will be saved on an annual basis, which in turn results in reduction of 239 tonnes of CO_{2}.

== Water ==
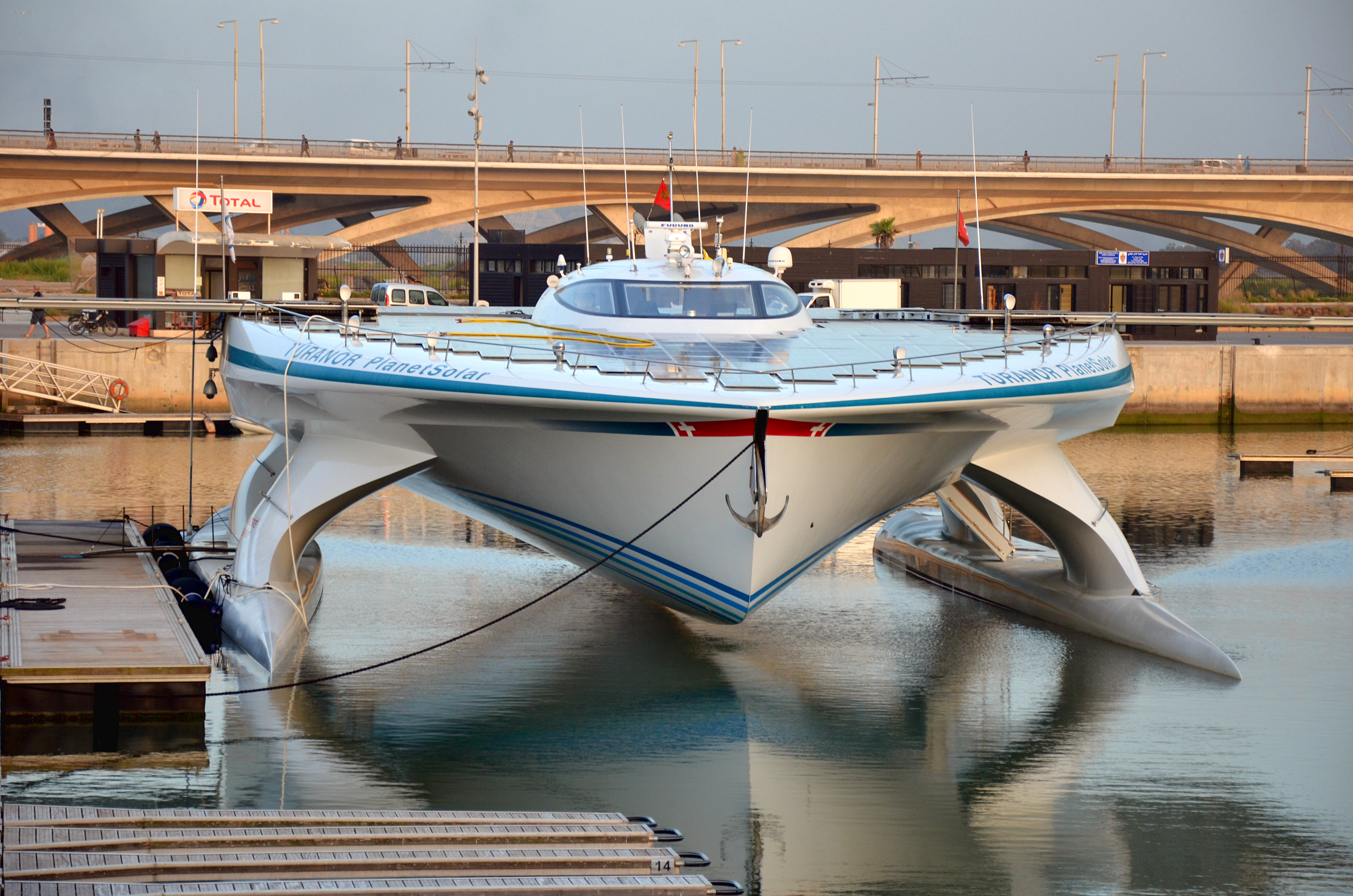
PlanetSolar, the world's largest solar-powered boat and the first ever solar electric vehicle to circumnavigate the globe (in 2012).

Solar powered boats have mainly been limited to rivers and canals, but in 2007 an experimental 14 m catamaran, the Sun21 sailed the Atlantic from Seville to Miami, and from there to New York. It was the first crossing of the Atlantic powered only by solar.

Japan's biggest shipping line Nippon Yusen KK and Nippon Oil Corporation said solar panels capable of generating 40 kilowatts of electricity would be placed on top of a 60,213 ton car carrier ship to be used by Toyota Motor Corporation.

In 2010, the Tûranor PlanetSolar, a 30-metre long, 15.2-metre wide catamaran yacht powered by 470 square metres of solar panels, was unveiled. It is, so far, the largest solar-powered boat ever built. In 2012, PlanetSolar became the first ever solar electric vehicle to circumnavigate the globe.

Various demonstration systems have been made. However, none have implemented water cooling.

The low power density of current solar panels limits the use of solar propelled vessels; however boats that use sails (which do not generate electricity unlike combustion engines) rely on battery power for electrical appliances (such as refrigeration, lighting and communications). Here solar panels have become popular for recharging batteries as they do not create noise, require fuel and often can be seamlessly added to existing deck space.

== Air ==
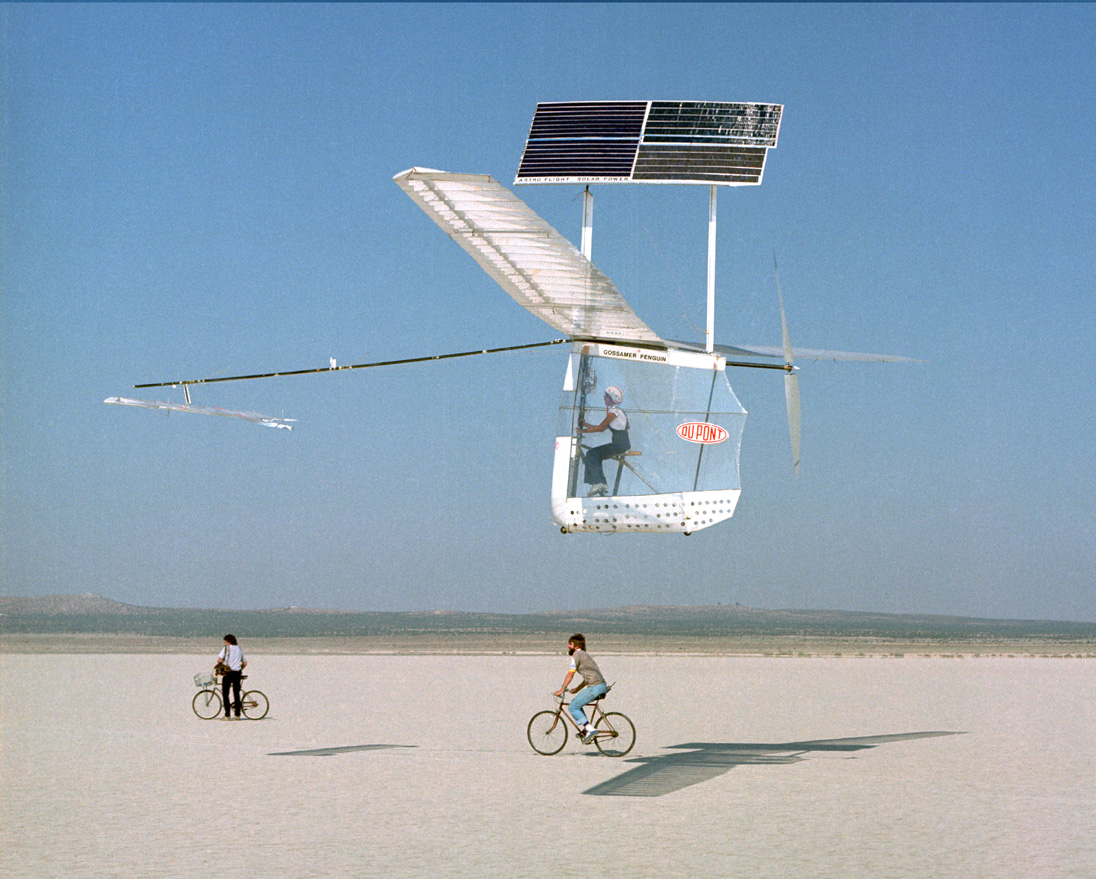
Gossamer Penguin

Solar ships can refer to solar powered airships or hybrid airships.

There is considerable military interest in unmanned aerial vehicles (UAVs); solar power would enable these to stay aloft for months, becoming a much cheaper means of doing some tasks done today by satellites. In September 2007, the first successful flight for 48h under constant power of a UAV was reported. This is likely to be the first commercial use for photovoltaics in flight.

Many demonstration solar aircraft have been built, some of the best known by AeroVironment.

=== Manned solar aircraft ===
- Gossamer Penguin
- Solar Challenger – This aircraft flew 262 kilometres (163 mi) from Paris, France, to England on solar power.
- Sunseeker Duo
- Solar Impulse – two single-seat aircraft, the second of which circumnavigated the Earth. The first aircraft completed a 26-hour test flight in Switzerland on 8–9 July 2010. The aircraft was flown to a height of nearly 8,500 m (27,900 ft) by André Borschberg. It flew overnight using battery power. The second aircraft, slightly larger and more powerful, took off from Abu Dhabi in 2015, flew towards India and then eastward across Asia. However, after experiencing battery overheating, it was forced to halt in Hawaii over the winter. In April 2016, it resumed its journey, and completed its circumnavigation of the globe, returning to Abu Dhabi on 26 July 2016.
- SolarStratos – Swiss stratospheric 2-seater solar plane aims to climb to the stratosphere.
- Solair – Solair I and Solair II are two German-designed electric aircraft.

=== Hybrid airships ===
An Australian-based company is working on a project to develop an air crane called the SkyLifter, a capable of lifting up to 150 tons.

A Canadian start-up, Solar Ship, Inc., is developing solar powered hybrid airships that can run on solar power alone. The idea is to create a viable platform that can travel anywhere in the world delivering cold medical supplies and other necessitates to locations in Africa and Northern Canada without needing any kind of fuel or infrastructure. The hope is that technology developments in solar cells and the large surface area provided by the hybrid airship are enough to make a practical solar powered aircraft. Some key features of the Solarship are that it can fly on aerodynamic lift alone without any lifting gas, and the solar cells along with the large volume of the envelope allow the hybrid airship to be reconfigured into a mobile shelter that can recharge batteries and other equipment.

The Hunt GravityPlane (not to be confused with the ground-based gravity plane) is a proposed gravity-powered glider by Hunt Aviation in the US. It also has aerofoil wings, improving its lift-drag ratio and making it more efficient. The GravityPlane requires a large size in order to obtain a large enough volume-to-weight ratio to support this wing structure, and no example has yet been built. Unlike a powered glider, the GravityPlane does not consume power during the climbing phase of flight. It does however consume power at the points where it changes its buoyancy between positive and negative values. Hunt claim that this can nevertheless improve the energy efficiency of the craft, similar to the improved energy efficiency of underwater gliders over conventional methods of propulsion. Hunt suggest that the low power consumption should allow the craft to harvest sufficient energy to stay aloft indefinitely. The conventional approach to this requirement is the use of solar panels in a solar-powered aircraft. Hunt has proposed two alternative approaches. One is to use a wind turbine and harvest energy from the airflow generated by the gliding motion, the other is a thermal cycle to extract energy from the differences in air temperature at different altitudes.

=== Unmanned aerial vehicles ===
- Pathfinder and Pathfinder-Plus – This UAV demonstrated that an airplane could stay aloft for an extended period of time fueled purely by solar power.
- Helios – Derived from the Pathfinder-Plus, this solar cell and fuel cell powered UAV set a world record for flight at 29,524 m (96,864 ft).
- Qinetiq Zephyr – built by Qinetiq, this UAV set the unofficial world record for longest duration unmanned flight at over 82 hours on 31 July 2008. Just 15 days after the Solar Impulse flight mentioned above, on 23 July 2010 the Zephyr, a lightweight unmanned aerial vehicle engineered by the United Kingdom defence firm QinetiQ, claimed the endurance record for an unmanned aerial vehicle. It flew in the skies of Arizona for over two weeks (336 hours). It has also soared to (21,562 m (70,741 ft).
- China's designed and manufactured UAV successfully reached an altitude of 20,000 metres (66,000 ft) during a test flight in the country's northwest regions. Named "Caihong" (CH), or "Rainbow" in English, it was developed by a research team from CASC.
- The BAE Systems PHASA-35 developed by BAE Systems & aerospace technology firm Prismatic.

=== Future projects ===
- Titan Aerospace acquired by Google aimed to develop the Solar UAV, however the project seems to be abandoned
- Sky-Sailor (aimed at Martian flight)
- Various solar airship projects, such as Lockheed Martin's "High Altitude Airship"

== Space ==
=== Solar powered spacecraft ===
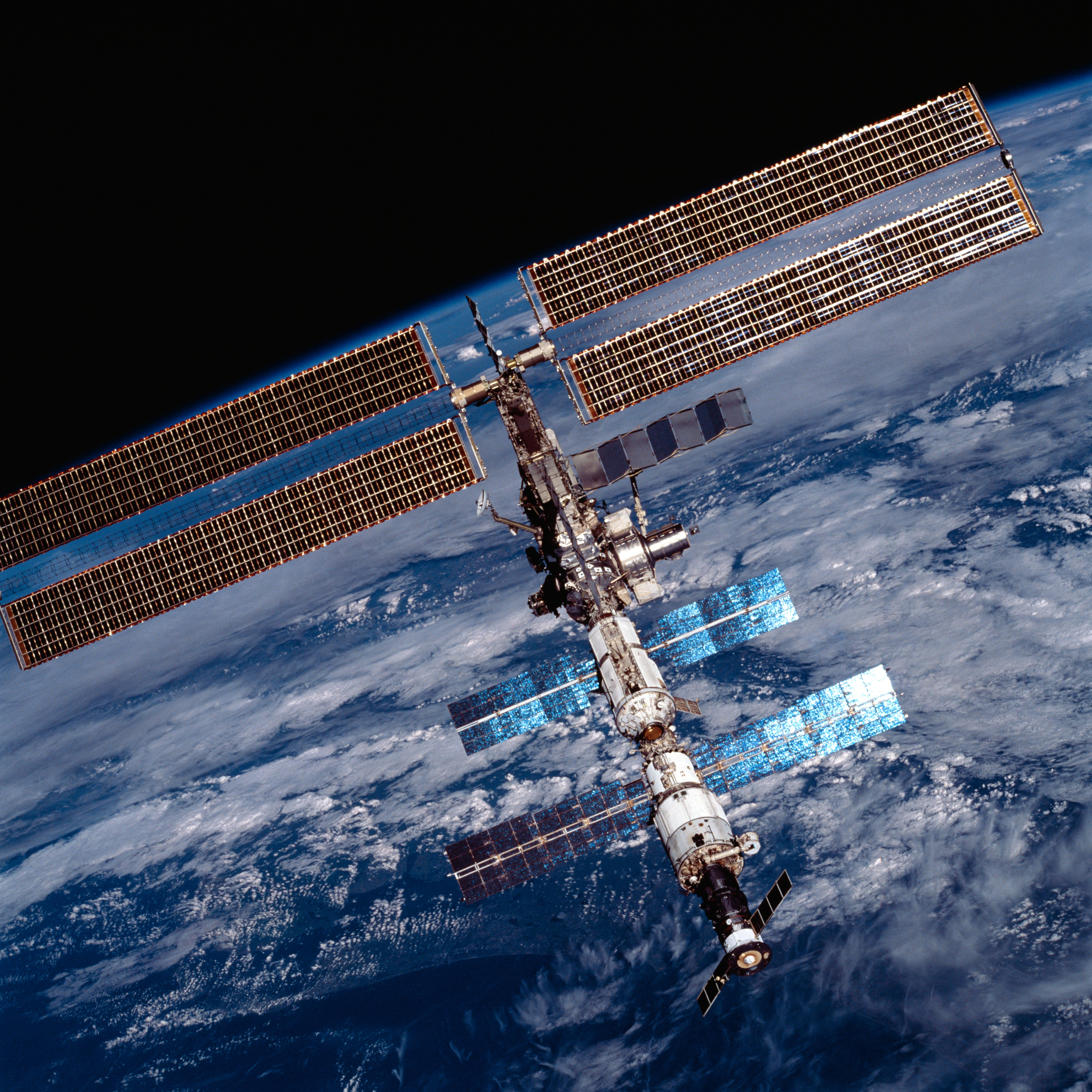
PV on the International Space Station

Solar energy is often used to supply power for satellites and spacecraft operating in the inner solar system since it can supply energy for a long time without excess fuel mass. A Communications satellite contains multiple radio transmitters which operate continually during its life. It would be uneconomic to operate such a vehicle (which may be on-orbit for years) from primary batteries or fuel cells, and refuelling in orbit is not practical. Solar power is not generally used to adjust the satellite's position, however, and the useful life of a communications satellite will be limited by the on-board station-keeping fuel supply.

=== Solar propelled spacecraft ===
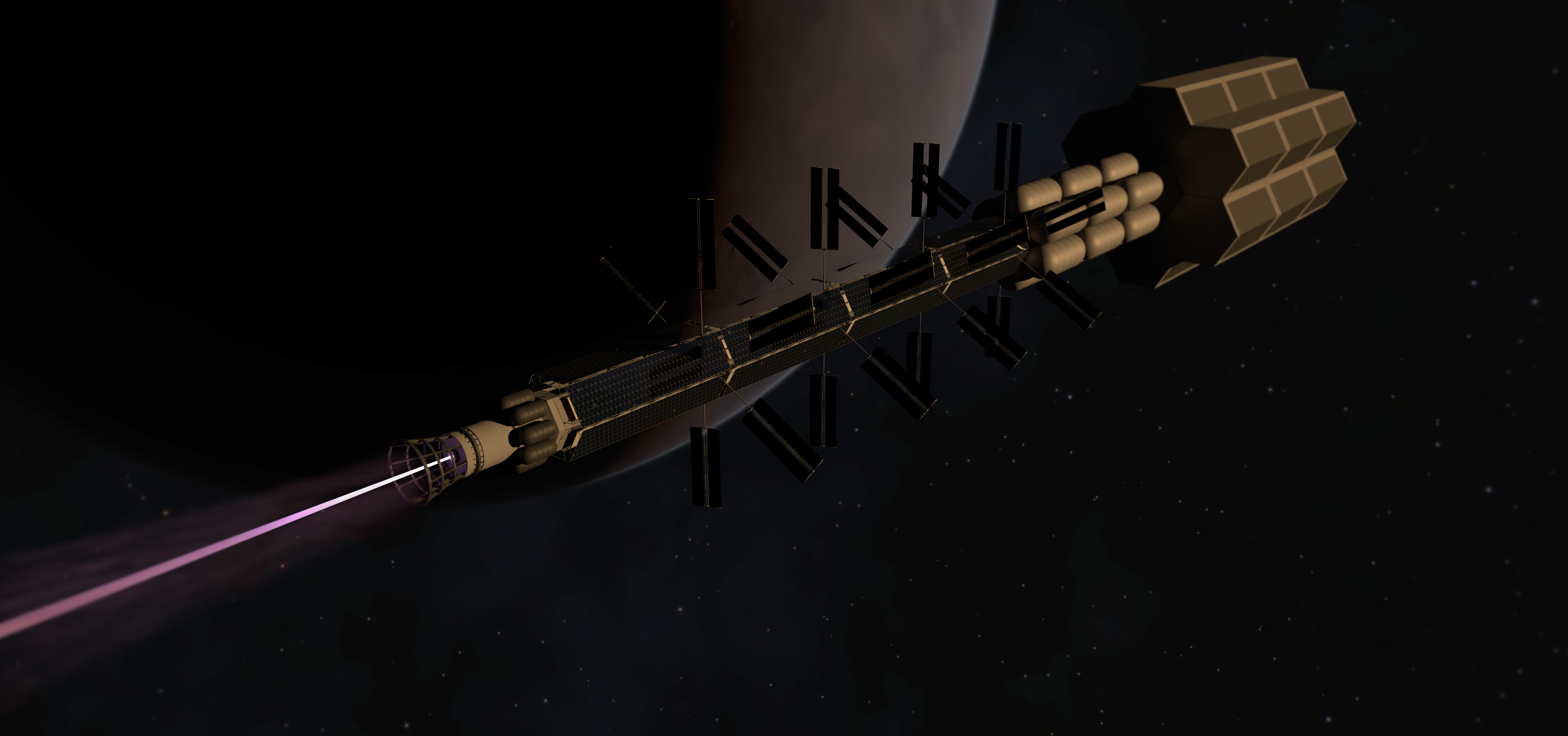
3D design of an electromagnetic propulsion pulsed fusion plasma thruster with solar panels

A few spacecraft operating within the orbit of Mars have used solar power as an energy source for their propulsion system.

All current solar powered spacecraft use solar panels in conjunction with electric propulsion, typically ion drives as this gives a very high exhaust velocity, and reduces the propellant over that of a rocket by more than a factor of ten. Since propellant is usually the biggest mass on many spacecraft, this reduces launch costs.

Other proposals for solar spacecraft include solar thermal heating of propellant, typically hydrogen or sometimes water is proposed. An electrodynamic tether can be used to change a satellite's orientation or adjust its orbit.

Another concept for solar propulsion in space is the light sail; this doesn't require conversion of light to electrical energy, instead relying directly on the tiny but persistent radiation pressure of light.

=== Planetary exploration ===
Perhaps the most successful solar-propelled vehicles have been the "rovers" used to explore surfaces of the Moon and Mars. The 1977 Lunokhod programme and the 1997 Mars Pathfinder used solar power to propel remote controlled vehicles. The operating life of these rovers far exceeded the limits of endurance that would have been imposed, had they been operated on conventional fuels. The two Mars Exploration Rovers also used solar power.

== Electric vehicle with solar assist ==
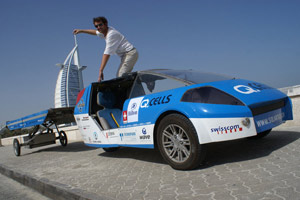
Louis Palmer standing in the Solartaxi.

A Swiss project, called "Solartaxi", circumnavigated the world. This was the first time in history an electric vehicle (not self sufficient solar vehicle) had gone around the world, covering 50000 km in 18 months and crossing 40 countries. It was a road-worthy electric vehicle hauling a trailer with solar panels, carrying a 6 m^{2} sized solar array. The Solartaxi has ZEBRA battery, which permit a range of 400 km without recharging. The car can also run for 200 km without the trailer. Its maximum speed is 90 km/h. The car weighs 500 kg and the trailer weighs 200 kg. According to initiator and tour director Louis Palmer, the car in mass production could be produced for 16000 Euros.

Solartaxi toured the World from July 2007 till December 2008 to show that solutions to stop global warming are available and to encourage people in pursuing alternatives to fossil fuel. Palmer suggests the most economical location for solar panels for an electric car is on building rooftops though, likening it to putting money into a bank in one location and withdrawing it in another.

Solar Electrical Vehicles is adding convex solar cells to the roof of hybrid electric vehicles.

=== Plug-in hybrid and solar vehicles ===
An interesting variant of the electric vehicle is the triple hybrid vehicle—the PHEV that has solar panels as well to assist.

The 2010 Toyota Prius model has an option to mount solar panels on the roof. They power a ventilation system while parked to help provide cooling. There are many applications of photovoltaics in transport either for motive power or as auxiliary power units, particularly where fuel, maintenance, emissions or noise requirements preclude internal combustion engines or fuel cells. Due to the limited area available on each vehicle either speed or range or both are limited when used for motive power.

== Limitations ==
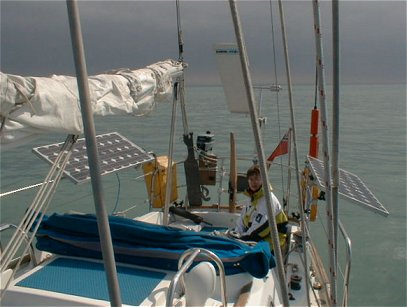
PV used for auxiliary power on a yacht

There are limits to using photovoltaic (PV) cells for vehicles:

- Power density: Power from a solar array is limited by the size of the vehicle and area that can be exposed to sunlight. This can also be overcome by adding a flatbed and connecting it to the car and this gives more area for panels for powering the car. While energy can be accumulated in batteries to lower peak demand on the array and provide operation in sunless conditions, the battery adds weight and cost to the vehicle. The power limit can be mitigated by plugging in and recharging the batteries from the electrical grid.
- Cost: While sunlight is free, PV cells to capture that sunlight is not. However the cost of solar cells declined by 99% in 4 decades and their cost is expected to continue to drop.
- Design considerations: Even though sunlight has no lifespan, PV cells do. In the 1980s the lifetime of a solar module was approximately 30 years. Stationary photovoltaic panels then often came with a warranty of 90% (from nominal power) after 10 years and 80% after 25 years. Mobile applications are unlikely to require lifetimes as long as building integrated PV and solar parks. To be successful in mobile applications, PV panels need to be designed to withstand vibrations.

== See also ==
- Electric aircraft – Aircraft powered directly by electricity, with no other engine needed
- Electric boat – Type of watercraft
- Frisian Solar Challenge – Solar boat race
- Kit car – Automobile that the buyer assembles into a functioning car
- List of solar car teams
- List of solar-powered products
- List of prototype solar-powered cars
- Plug-in hybrid – Hybrid vehicle with externally chargeable battery
- Solar balloon – Type of aerostat that gains buoyancy from air heated by the Sun
- Solar Golf Cart – Small vehicle designed originally to carry golfers
- South African Solar Challenge – Bi-annual South African event that is to be held for the first time in 2008
- The Quiet Achiever – Australian solar powered vehicle
- Tour de Sol – Solar powered vehicles
- Wind-powered vehicle – Vehicle propelled by wind
