= Venturi Astrolab =

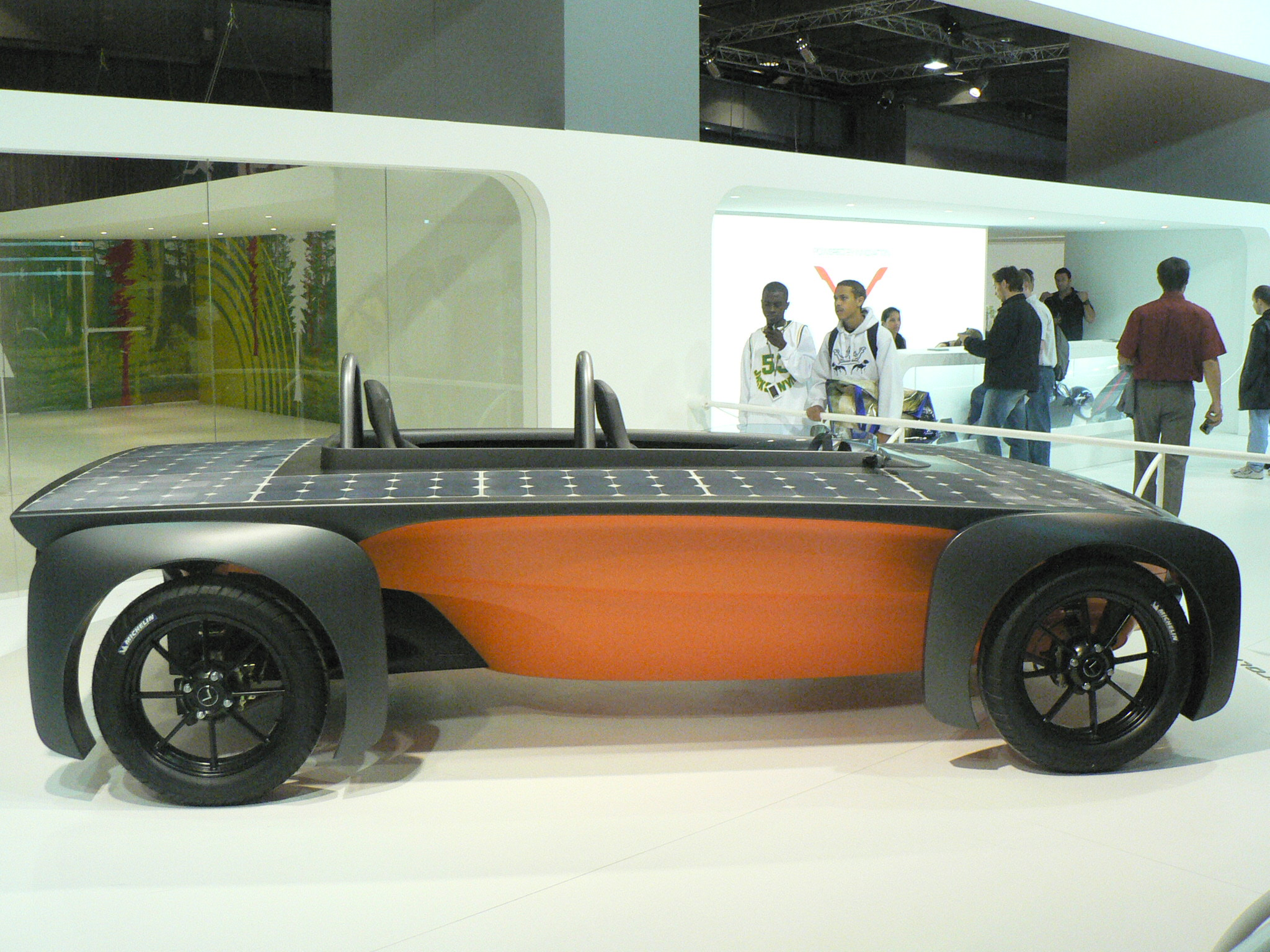

Overview
- Manufacturer: Venturi (electric car company)
- Production: 2006
- Assembly: Monaco
- Designer: Sacha Lakic

Body and chassis
- Class: Hybrid

Powertrain
- Electric motor: 2006: 16 kW (21 hp; 22 PS), central rear mounted
- Transmission: Differential gear reduction with limited-slip differential, direct hold
- Battery: 7kWh Lithium iron phosphate
- Range: 110 km (68 mi)

Dimensions
- Wheelbase: 2,500 mm (98.4 in)
- Length: 3,800 mm (149.6 in)
- Width: 1,840 mm (72.4 in)
- Height: 1,200 mm (47.2 in)
- Curb weight: 280 kg (620 lb)

The Venturi Astrolab was an early-2000s concept battery electric car with adjunct energy provided from solar panels mounted to the vehicle. It was unveiled at the Mondial de l’Automobile in 2006.

== Technical specifications ==
The original Venturi Astrolab uses a 16 kW (21 hp; 22 PS) electric motor in place of the internal combustion engine fitted to most cars. This electric motor also had a claimed maximum torque output of 36.8 lb⋅ft (5 kg⋅m; 50 N⋅m), delivered instantly. The top speed of the Venturi Astrolab 74.5 mph (120 km/h).

With its bodywork composed of 3.6 m^{2} (39 sq ft) of high efficiency (21%) solar cells, the Astrolab was aiming for a concept of zero emission vehicle; it was unveiled at the Mondial de l’Automobile in 2006. The builder claimed that the average daily intake of the solar cells would enable a range of 11 mi (18 km). If greater range is required, the onboard batteries extend this to 62 mi (100 km).

== See also ==
- Solar vehicle
