= California State University, Los Angeles =

Public university in Los Angeles, California, U.S.

- Former names: Los Angeles State College of Applied Arts and Sciences (1947–1964); California State College at Los Angeles (1964–1972)
- Motto: Vox Veritas Vita (Latin)
- Motto in English: "Voice Truth Life" – Speak the truth as a way of life
- Type: Public university
- Established: 1947; 79 years ago
- Parent institution: California State University
- Accreditation: WSCUC
- Academic affiliations: CUMU; Space-grant
- Endowment: $62.52 million (2023–24) As of June 30, 2024.
- President: Berenecea Eanes
- Provost: Heather Lattimer
- Faculty: 1,031
- Students: 22,740 (fall 2024)
- Undergraduates: 19,350 (fall 2024)
- Postgraduates: 3,390 (fall 2024)
- Location: Los Angeles, California, United States; 34°04′00″N 118°10′04″W
- Campus: 175 acres (71 ha); Large city
- Other campuses: Alhambra , Downtown LA
- Newspaper: University Times
- Colors: Black and gold
- Nickname: Golden Eagles
- Sporting affiliations: NCAA Division II – CCAA; PacWest
- Mascot: Eddie the Golden Eagle
- Website: calstatela.edu
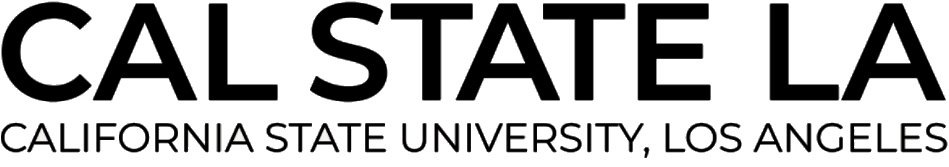

California State University, Los Angeles (Cal State LA) is a public research university in Los Angeles, California, United States. It is part of the California State University system. Cal State LA offers 142 bachelor's degree programs, 122 master's degree programs, and 4 doctoral degrees: the Doctor of Philosophy in special education (in collaboration with the University of California, Los Angeles), Doctor of Education in Educational Leadership, Doctor of Nursing Practice, and Doctor of Audiology. It also offers 22 teaching credentials.

Cal State LA is located near the eastern edge of the city of Los Angeles, adjacent to the western San Gabriel Valley cities of Alhambra and Monterey Park. It had a student body of 22,740 as of Fall 2024, which includes 19,350 undergraduates, primarily from the Greater Los Angeles area, and 3,390 graduate students. It is organized into 9 colleges that house a total of 4 schools and approximately 50 academic departments, divisions, and interdisciplinary programs. The university's forensic science program is one of the oldest in the nation. The Early Entrance Program in the Honors College for gifted students as young as 12 is the only one of its kind in the United States in promoting a direct transitional scheme from middle and high school to college without intermediary remedial education. Cal State LA is a Hispanic-serving institution and is eligible to be designated as an Asian American Native American Pacific Islander serving institution (AANAPISI).

Cal State LA is located about 5 miles (8 km) northeast of Downtown Los Angeles.

The 175-acre (71 ha) hilltop campus core is home to the nation's first Charter College of Education, the Pat Brown Institute for Public Affairs, the Hertzberg–Davis Forensic Science Center, the Hydrogen Research and Fueling Facility, and the Luckman Fine Arts Complex.

It is also home to two high schools: the Marc and Eva Stern Math and Science School and the Los Angeles County High School for the Arts (LACHSA), the only arts high school in Los Angeles that allows students from any district within Los Angeles County to attend.

== History ==
=== First half of 20th century ===
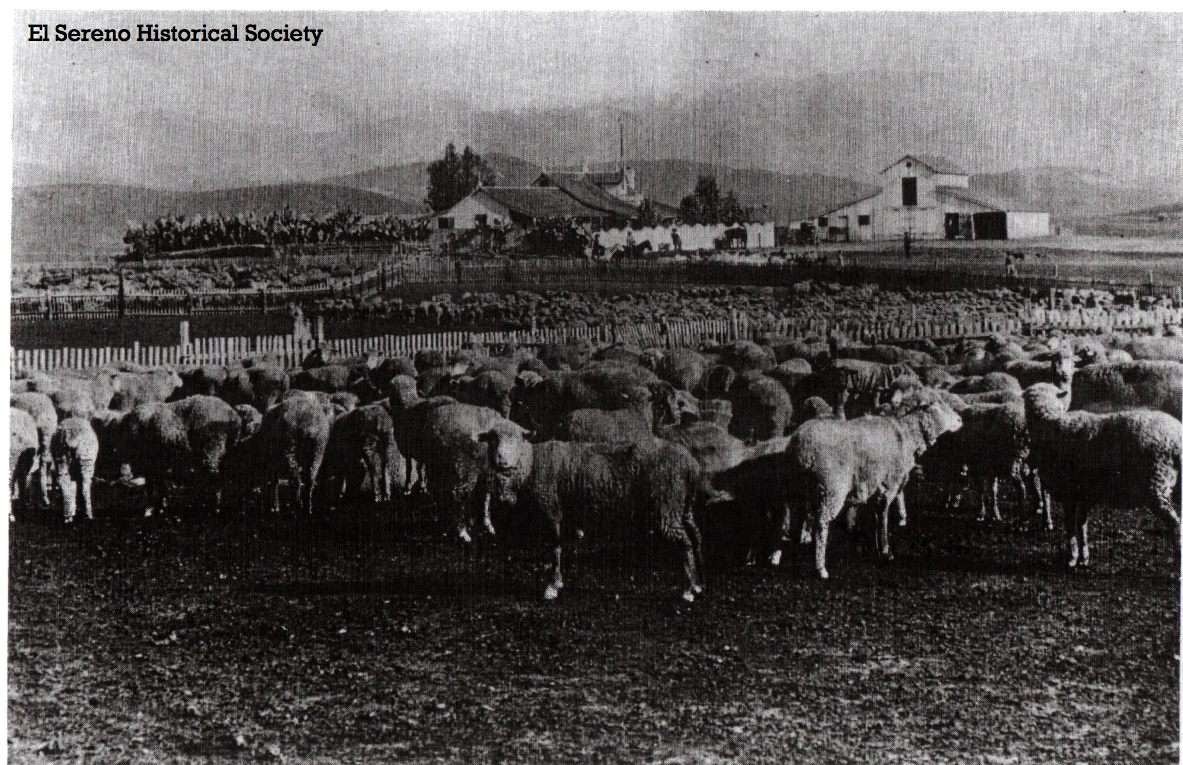
Flock of sheep with houses in background, Los Angeles County, about 1880, Photo taken on the Rancho Rosa de Castillo.

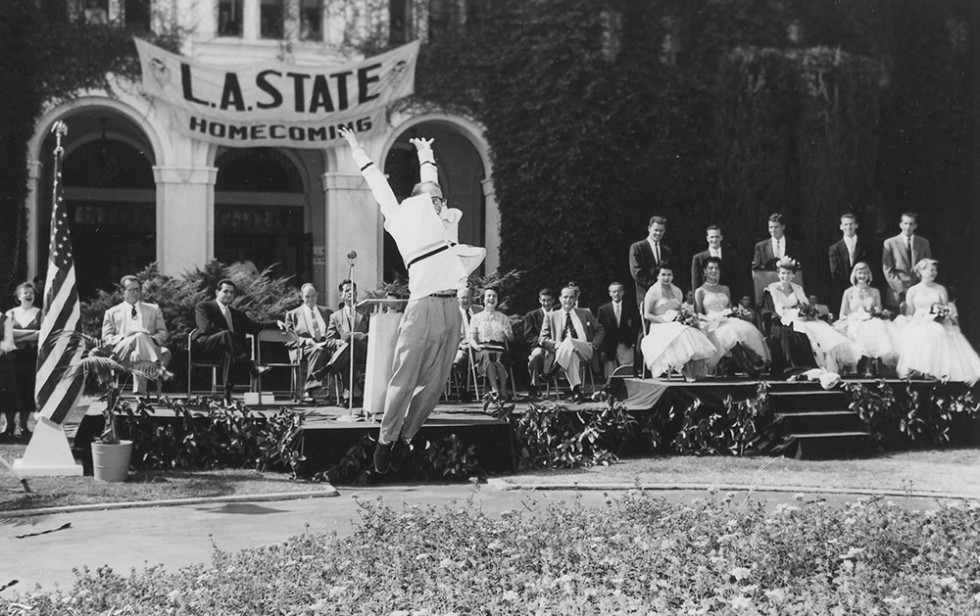
Homecoming in the 1940s at Cal State LA

The university is located on the site of one of California's 36 original adobes, built in 1776 by Franciscan missionaries and destroyed by fire in 1908. When the Spanish Franciscans founded the San Gabriel Mission in 1771, they dubbed the small river El Rio Rosa de Castillo. These lands once were part of a Mexican land grant known as Rancho Rosa Castilla. Juan Batista Batz, a Basque rancher from northern Spain and his wife, Catalina settled here in the 1852. Batz used the land for farming and intensive sheep ranching. The inspiration for the name of the ranch, according to local historians, was the abundant amount of native wild Wood roses (Rosa californica) that grew near the ranch home along the creek. The Tongva Indians named this area, Ochuunga (Place of Roses). The main drive through the campus is known as Paseo Rancho Castilla, in acknowledgment of the university's historic heritage.

Cal State LA was founded on July 2, 1947, by an act of the California legislature and opened for classes as Los Angeles State College on the campus of Los Angeles City College (LACC). LACC is a public community college in East Hollywood, Los Angeles located on Vermont Avenue south of Santa Monica Boulevard, the former campus of UCLA and originally a farm outside Los Angeles. As president of LACC, P. Victor Peterson became the acting president of the state college. Since the college had opened in September, 1947, with 136 students, it had grown in two years to over 2,000 students. Most were studying under the GI Bill, which had been largely responsible for establishment of the college. The first class of seven students graduated in 1948.

In 1949, when Howard S. McDonald became president of both Los Angeles State College and Los Angeles City College, the state college upper division classes were being taught in borrowed spaces on the City College campus by mostly part-time faculty. He hired administrators to help him formally organize the colleges. Then he found a site within Los Angeles to house the new "Los Angeles State College of Applied Arts and Sciences," which replaced the Los Angeles State College also in 1949 after being reconstituted by the Legislature. McDonald enjoyed telling how some influential supporters of the University of Southern California opposed his selection of a piece of land in Baldwin Hills, and how then-Los Angeles Mayor Norris Poulson ran him out of Chavez Ravine so that he could lure the Dodgers baseball team to Los Angeles.

=== Second half of 20th century ===
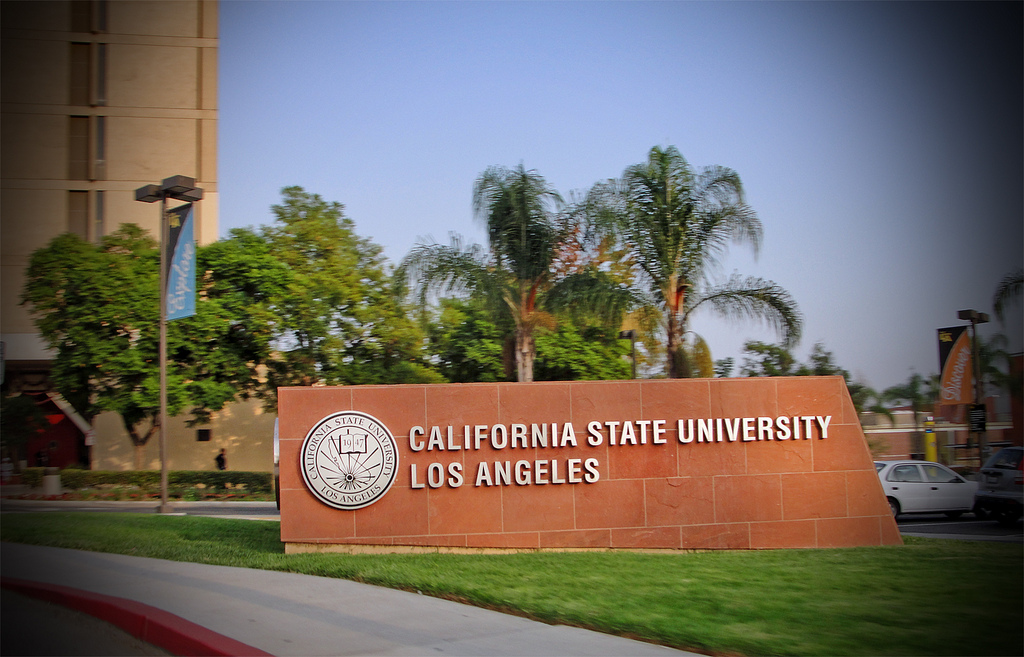
Entrance to the administration building.

In 1952, the state proposed a new satellite campus for Cal State LA, at the time known as Los Angeles State College, and in July 1958, the campus separated from Cal State LA and was renamed San Fernando Valley State College (now known as California State University, Northridge). The first master's degrees were awarded in 1952.

Since 1954, Cal State LA has been accredited by the Western Association of Schools and Colleges. The university's credential programs are approved by the Commission for Teacher Credentialing Committee on Accreditation.

In 1955, officials broke ground on the current location, dubbed the Ramona site at the time. The college then moved to its present campus in the northeastern section of the City of Los Angeles, 5 miles (8 km) east of the Civic Center. The college opened in its new location in 1958, with McDonald becoming the first full-time president. When McDonald retired in 1962, seven academic buildings on the new campus were completed and an eighth structure (North Hall, later named King Hall) was nearing completion. North Hall opened in September 1962.

In 1962, the college welcomed its third president Albert D. Graves who was vice president of Academic Affairs of LASCAAS. The college also entered into its first contract to prepare students for the United States Peace Corps. The first group of 65 volunteers was trained for service in the Dominican Republic in the areas of teacher training, music teacher training and urban community action. The first Commencement at new site takes place in June 1963.

On December 6, 1963, the California State College Board of Trustees named the library after the late 35th president of the United States John F. Kennedy. An edifice plaque was unveiled during the John F. Kennedy Memorial Library naming ceremony on February 12, 1964, and in November 1969 the library North Wing is dedicated.

In 1964, the Board of Trustees of the California State Colleges changed the name of the college to the "California State College at Los Angeles" (CSCLA), and in 1968 to "California State College, Los Angeles", when it became part of the California State College (CSC) system. In 1972, CSCLA was awarded university status and was renamed California State University, Los Angeles (CSULA).

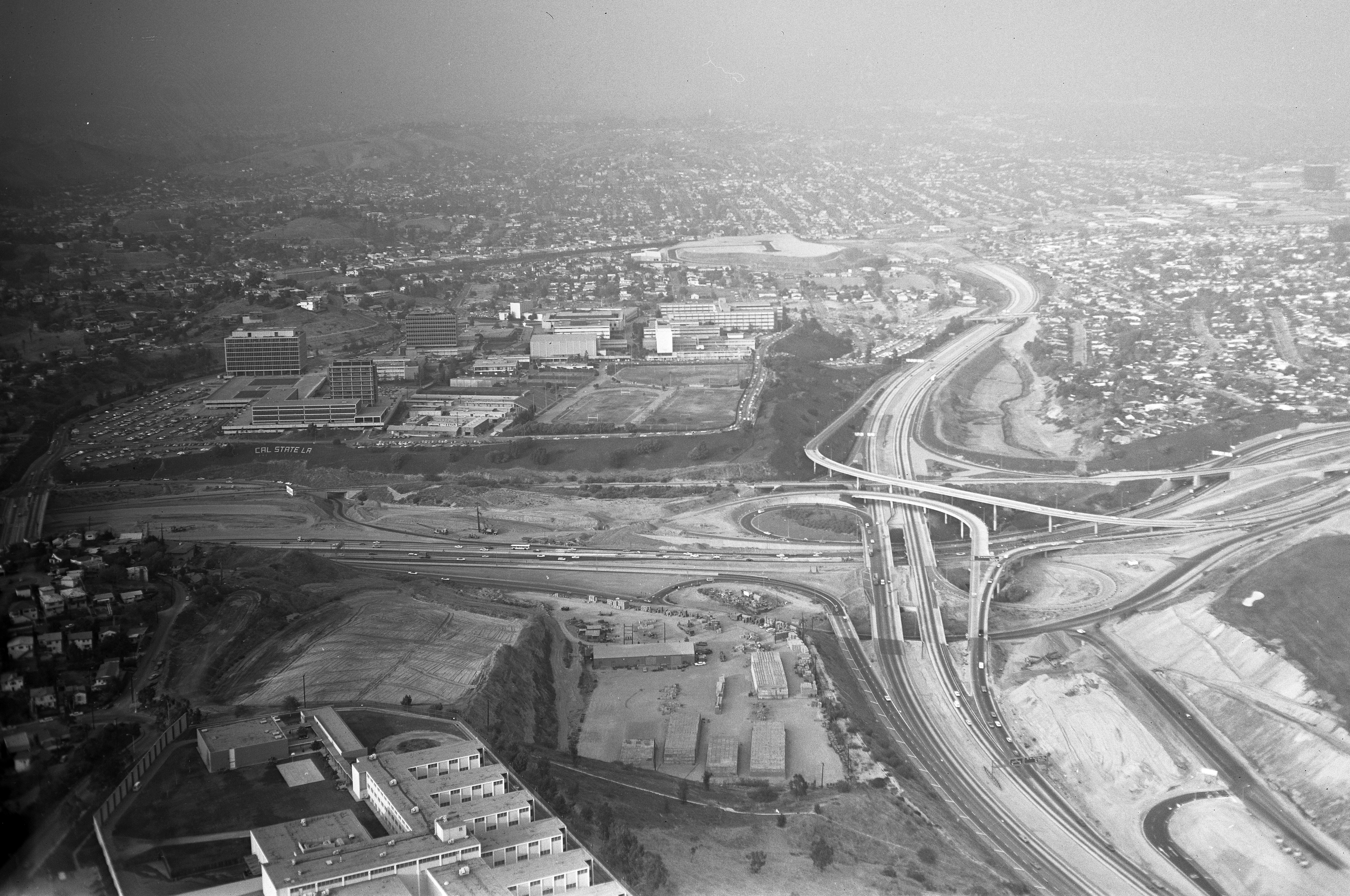
Aerial view of California State University, Los Angeles campus, January 31, 1972

In 1968, Cal State LA established the nation's first Chicano Studies department.

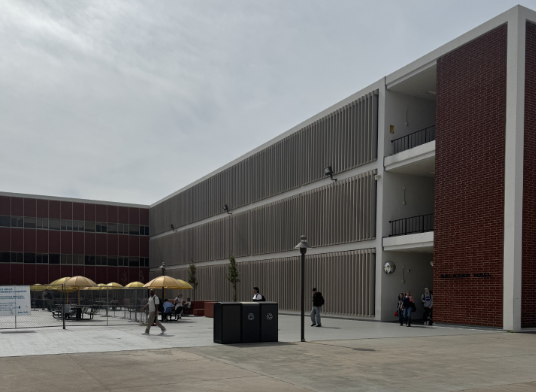
Salazar Hall, located on the south side of campus, is home to many disciplines across all fields of study, including math, finance, and nursing.

In fall 1970, the South Tower and South Hall were completed and opened. July 1976 the CSU Board of Trustees approved the renaming of South Tower to Simpson Tower, in memory of Floyd R. Simpson, first dean of the School of Business and Economics. South Hall was renamed Salazar Hall in memory of slain Los Angeles Times journalist and KMEX-DT news director Ruben Salazar.

The original mascot of the school was the Diablo. In 1980, new university president James Rosser adopted a new mascot, Eddie the golden eagle, designed to be more reflective of the campus' highly diverse community. The theme was extended to student facilities such as the student union and bookstore.

In 1993, the California State University Chancellor and Trustees approved development of Cal State LA's Charter College of Education, creating the first such college of higher education in the nation.

In October 1998, the Center for Environmental Analysis, first of its kind funded by the National Science Foundation on the West Coast, opened on campus.

=== 21st century ===
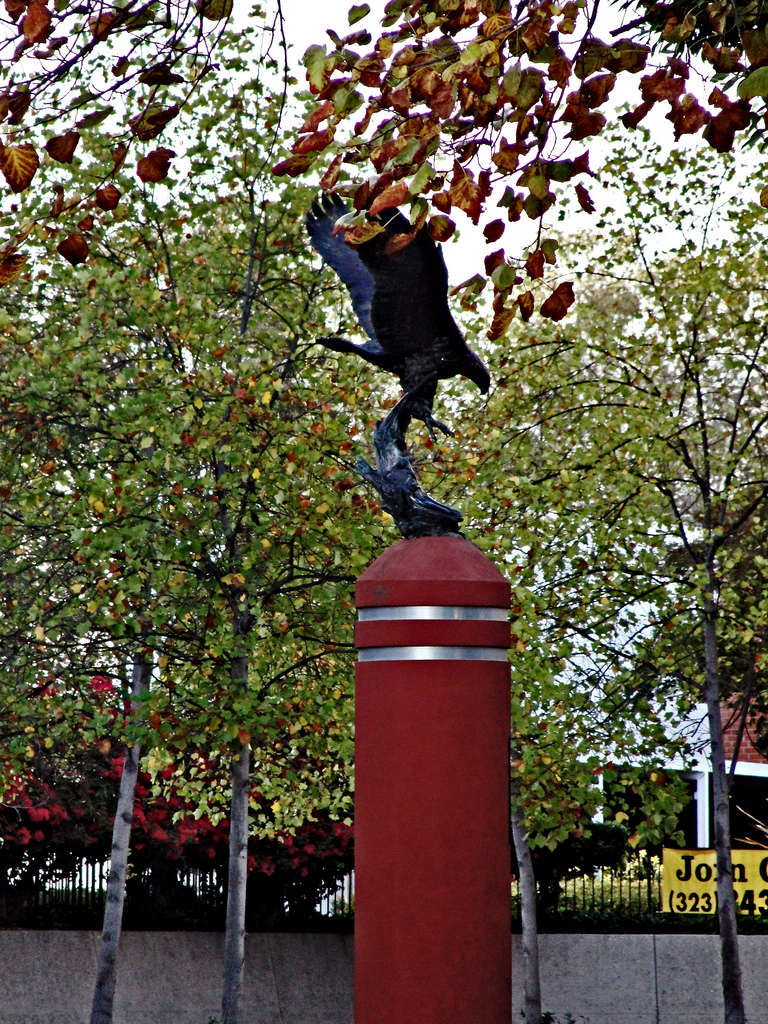
Bronze sculpture of Cal State LA's golden eagle mascot by Kenneth Bjorge

In September 2000, Governor of California Gray Davis chose the Cal State LA campus to hold a press conference at which he signed the historic bills expanding the Cal Grant program.

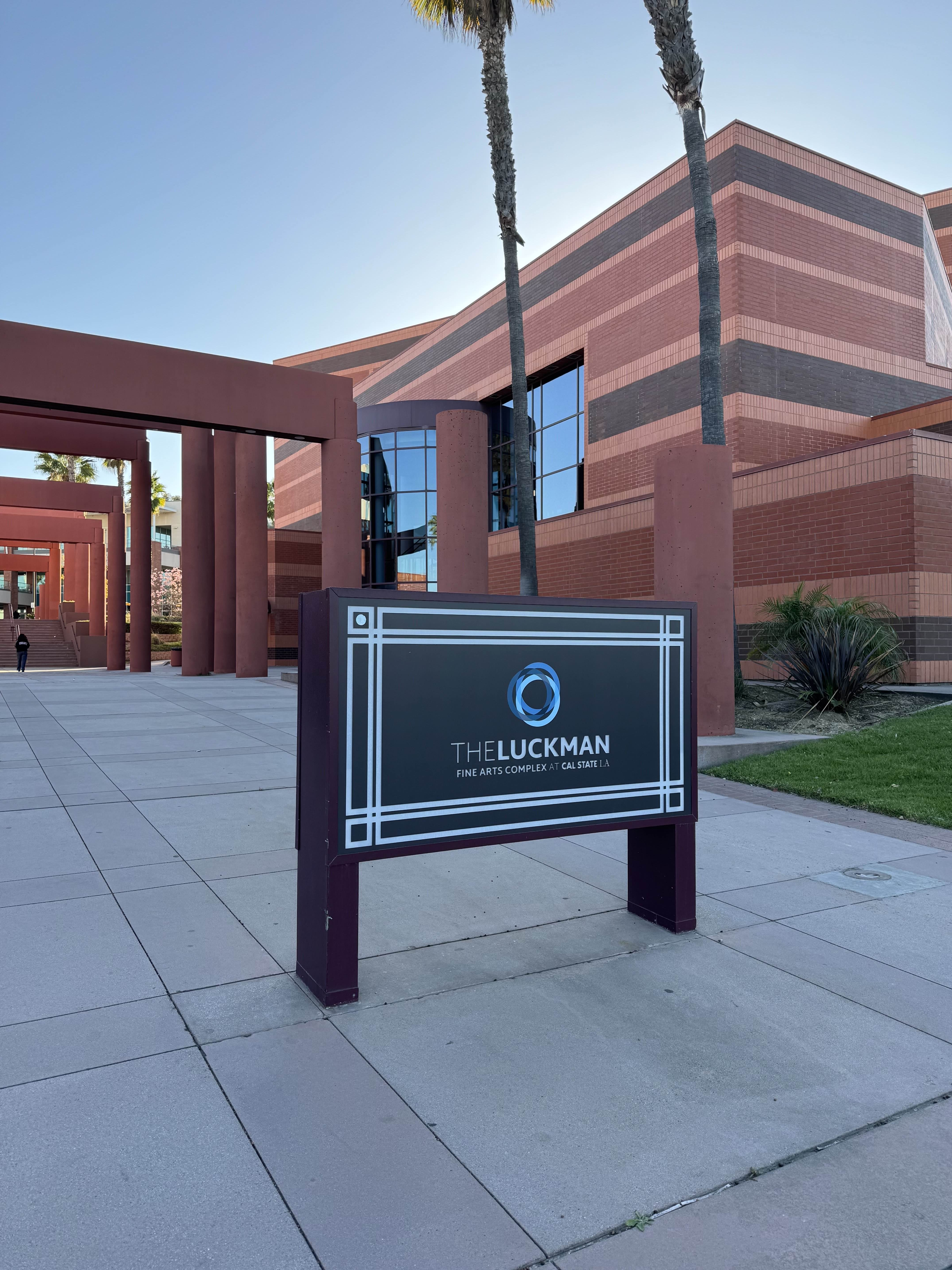
Sign of the Luckman Fine Arts Complex at Cal State University Los Angeles.

Cal State LA departments of Social Work and Nursing, located within the university's College of Health and Human Services, were granted the status of School in Winter 2002.

Cal State LA Downtown is a satellite campus opened in January 2016. Programs are provided through the university's College of Professional & Global Education.

Naming of the Rongxiang Xu College of Health and Human Services took place during the university's 69th Commencement on June 11, 2016. The naming recognized the largest gift in the university's history and named in honor of the late Dr. Rongxiang Xu, who was a surgeon and expert in regenerative medicine.

The Patricia A. Chin School of Nursing was dedicated as the first named school at Cal State L.A. in April 2018. Chin taught nursing at the university, later serving as director and, upon her retirement, professor emerita.

A statue of Cal State LA alumna and world champion tennis legend Billie Jean King was installed on the grassy area in front of the Physical Education building. When King was in school at Cal State LA, she had already won Wimbledon.

=== University presidents ===
The following persons served as president of Cal State LA:

No.	President	Term start	Term end	Notes
1	P. Victor Peterson	1947	October 31, 1949	
2	Howard S. McDonald	November 1, 1949	August 30, 1962	
3	Albert D. Graves	September 1, 1962	September 30, 1963	acting
4	Franklyn A. Johnson	October 1, 1963	November 10, 1965	
	John A. Greenlee	November 11, 1965	May 24, 1966	acting
5	John A. Greenlee	May 24, 1966	August 30, 1979	
6	James M. Rosser	September 1, 1979	August 30, 2013	
7	William A. Covino	September 1, 2013	June 30, 2023	
interim	Leroy M. Morishita	July 31, 2023	January 7, 2024	
8	Berenecea Johnson Eanes	January 8, 2024	present	

== Campus and Campus Life ==
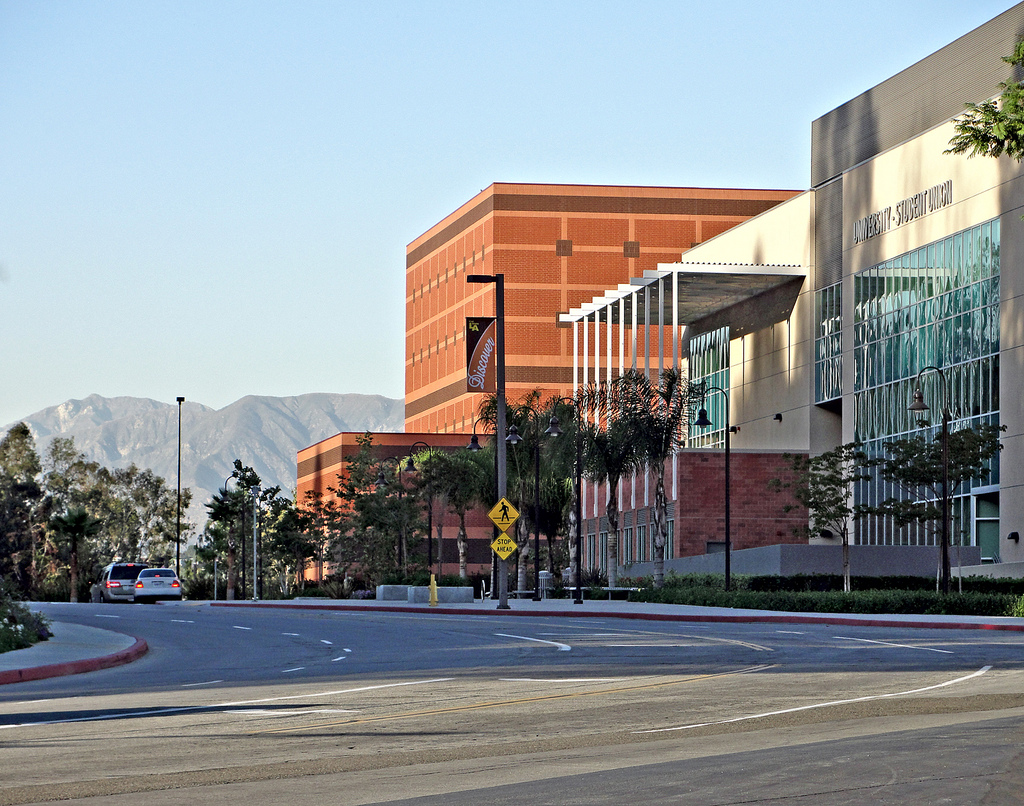
Cal State LA University-Student Union (U-SU) and Luckman Theatre

As of the fall of 2016, Cal State LA switched over from the quarter to the semester system. Tuition and fees for in-state is $6,745, $17,245 for out-of-state and room and board $11,723 as of the 2018–2019 academic year with a student/faculty ratio of 25:1. Classes are scheduled Monday through Saturday from 7 am until 10 pm.

Near the edge of the city of Los Angeles, adjacent to the western San Gabriel Valley cities of Alhambra and Monterey Park, the campus affords views of the mountains to the north, the San Gabriel Valley to the east, metropolitan Los Angeles to the west, and the Palos Verdes Peninsula and Catalina Island to the south.

Construction on a $30 million University-Student Union (U-SU) building began in 2005; it opened in January 2009. The facility offers a place for students and faculty to congregate and interact before or after class. It replaced the 1975 U-SU building that was closed in 2004 due to seismic concerns. The U-SU offers a theater, a fitness center, and an array of other services dedicated to the student body. Its meeting rooms connect to those of The Golden Eagle building via a third floor bridge. The Golden Eagle includes a food court, a Barnes & Noble-operated bookstore and major conference facilities. The university food court is owned by the Coca-Cola Company, offering a selection of fast food restaurants that include El Pollo Loco, Carl's Jr., The Spot, and Juice It Up. The U-SU facility houses additional fast food options.

Cal State LA is one of only eight institutions in North and South America selected as a Rockefeller Foundation humanities fellowship residency site.

As of fall 2018 Cal State LA has the second largest enrollment percentage of Mexican Americans and Other Latino Americans that are not Mexican-American in the Cal State University system. Other Latinos Americans having heritage from Central America, South America and the Caribbean.

The HBO show Silicon Valley used the face of the U-SU as the building for the Hooli company.

Undergraduate demographics (Fall cohort) (Note: According to the U.S. Department of Education College Scorecard's data download page, the dataset was last updated June 10, 2026.)
Race and ethnicity	Total
Hispanic	78%
Asian	10%
Foreign national	1%
White	4%
Black	4%
Unknown	2%
Two or more races (Note: Other consists of Multiracial Americans & those who prefer to not say.)	2%
Economic diversity
Low-income (Note: The percentage of students who received an income-based federal Pell grant intended for low-income students.)	66%
Middle-class or above (Note: The percentage of students who are a part of the American middle class at the bare minimum.)	34%

=== Associated Students ===
Associated Students Incorporated (ASI) is the student government of California State University, Los Angeles. ASI is governed by a student board of directors who are elected each year by the student body of Cal State LA. ASI represents the interests of the student body and acts as the officially recognized voice of the students. In addition, ASI sponsors a number of campus events and activities using mandatory student fees.

=== Eagle Advocates ===
Eagle Advocates, or ASI's Lobby Corps, is the sole student advocacy group representing the entire student body of the school.

=== Janice Cordova Garden of Well-Being ===
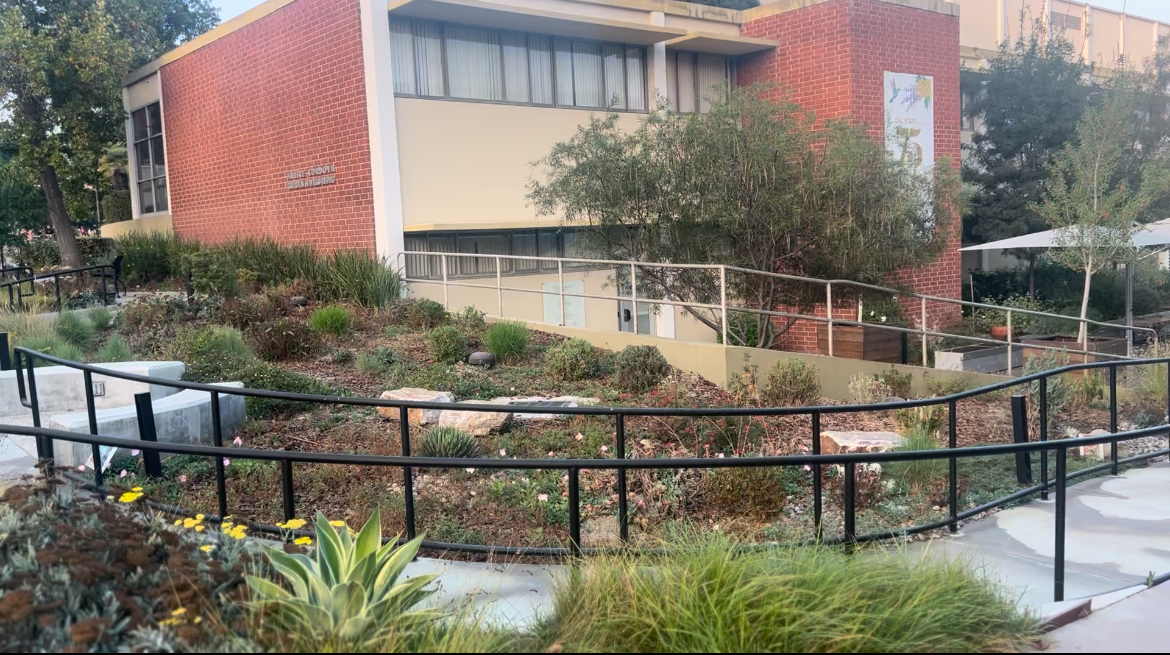
Janice Cordova Garden located behind the Career Center building with a seating area. The space includes benches and various plants.

Cal State LA dedicated the Janice Cordova Garden of Well-Being on April 21, 2022, named in honor of the late wife of alumnus Richard Cordova. The garden is located in the heart of campus, between the Center for Engagement, Service, and the Public Good and the Student Health Center. It is a peaceful space that features a meditative walking path, artwork, and more than 50 types of plant life that promote relaxation, healing, and transcendence.

== Student housing ==
From 1964 to 1972, developer Louis Lesser built six off-campus, 10-story high-rise residential halls to house 3,600 students. The 175-acre (71 ha) campus lacked space for horizontal expansion, following the California State University expansion plan started in 1959. This doubled the university's housing capacity, making Cal State LA the largest in the California State University system. Maxwell Starkman & Associates, AIA, of Beverly Hills, designed the development plan. Unlike other components of the Cal State University system being developed in the 1960s, the residence halls were privately financed by Louis Lesser Enterprises, Inc. The first residential life complex phase I on-campus housing was opened in June 1984, and three years later, a second residential life complex Phase II was opened. Cal State LA has a student-housing complex where students can rent a house at double occupancy for $655.00 per month (as of November 2009). During 1984 Summer Olympics that took place in Los Angeles, Cal State LA student houses were upgraded and expanded to house Olympic athletes.

Lesser also pioneered underground parking, with his Cal State LA development, at the time considered unusual enough to merit a separate newspaper section header, "Parking Underground", which described a two-level underground parking lot as a "concept" of "subterranean spaces".

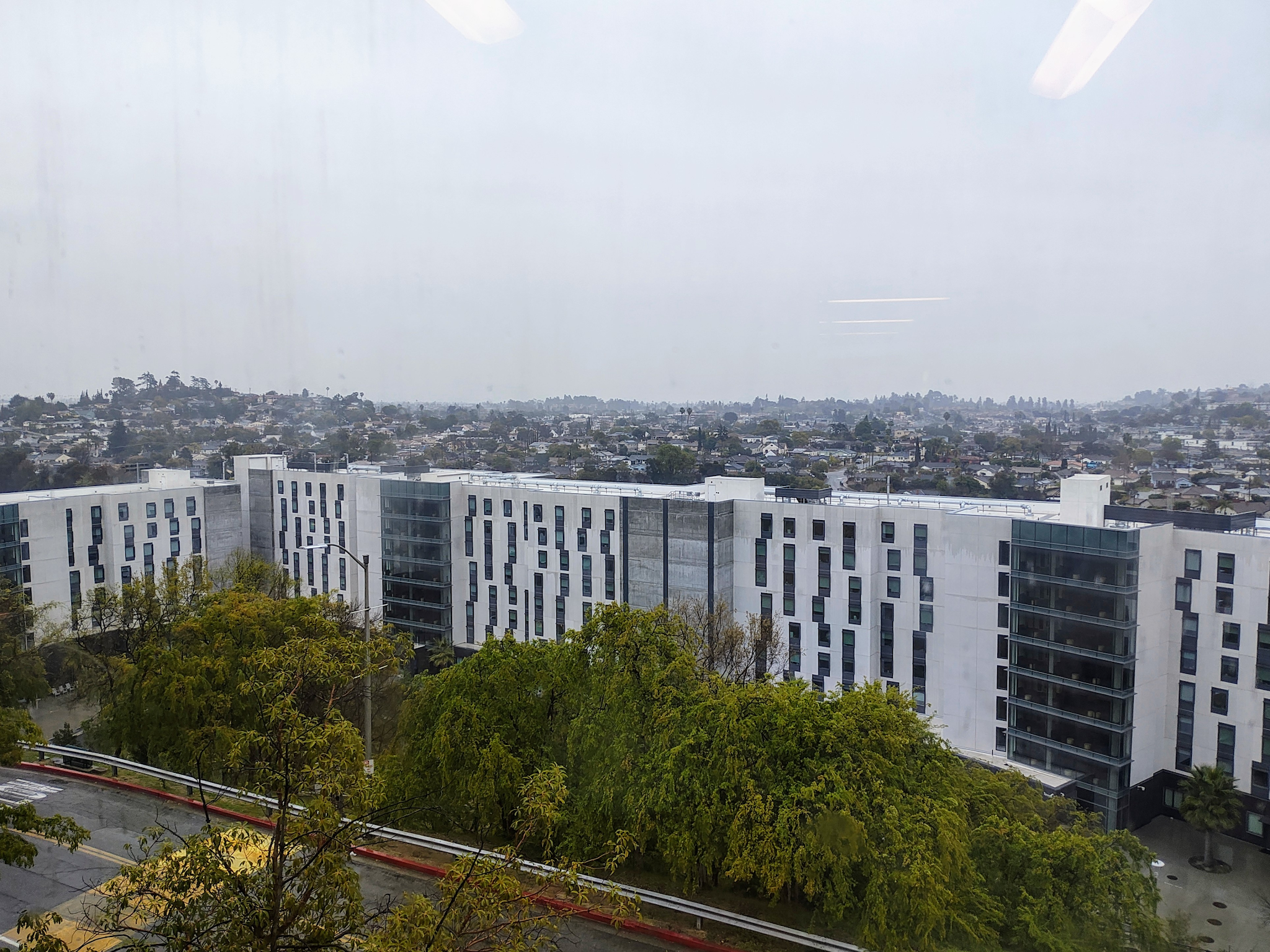
View of the Southern Village of the Student Housing East buildings

The Student Housing East project was completed in 2021. The North Campus Project provides for new student housing facilities, new soccer fields, and a parking structure]within the northern portion of the Cal State LA campus. Scope of the Work: The student housing facilities provide 1,500 beds for freshmen and sophomore students, as well as an associated dining facility.

=== Themed-living communities ===
Resident Scholars Housing The goal of Resident Scholars Housing is to provide Cal State LA Honors College and academically achieving students with themed housing that supports the mission and vision of the Honors College and the Institutional Learning Outcomes by forming a strong community of students through shared Honors classes, providing learning opportunities and social engagement beyond the classroom and engaging in a student-directed community. It also increases the following: student interaction with Honors faculty, staff and fellow students; involvement in the larger Los Angeles and Cal State LA community; and retention and graduation rates.

Halisi Scholars Living Learning Community The Halisi Scholars Living Learning Community is designed to enhance the residential experience for students who are a part of or interested in issues regarding the Black community living on campus by offering the opportunity to connect with faculty and peers, and engage in programs that focus on academic success, cultural awareness and civic engagement.

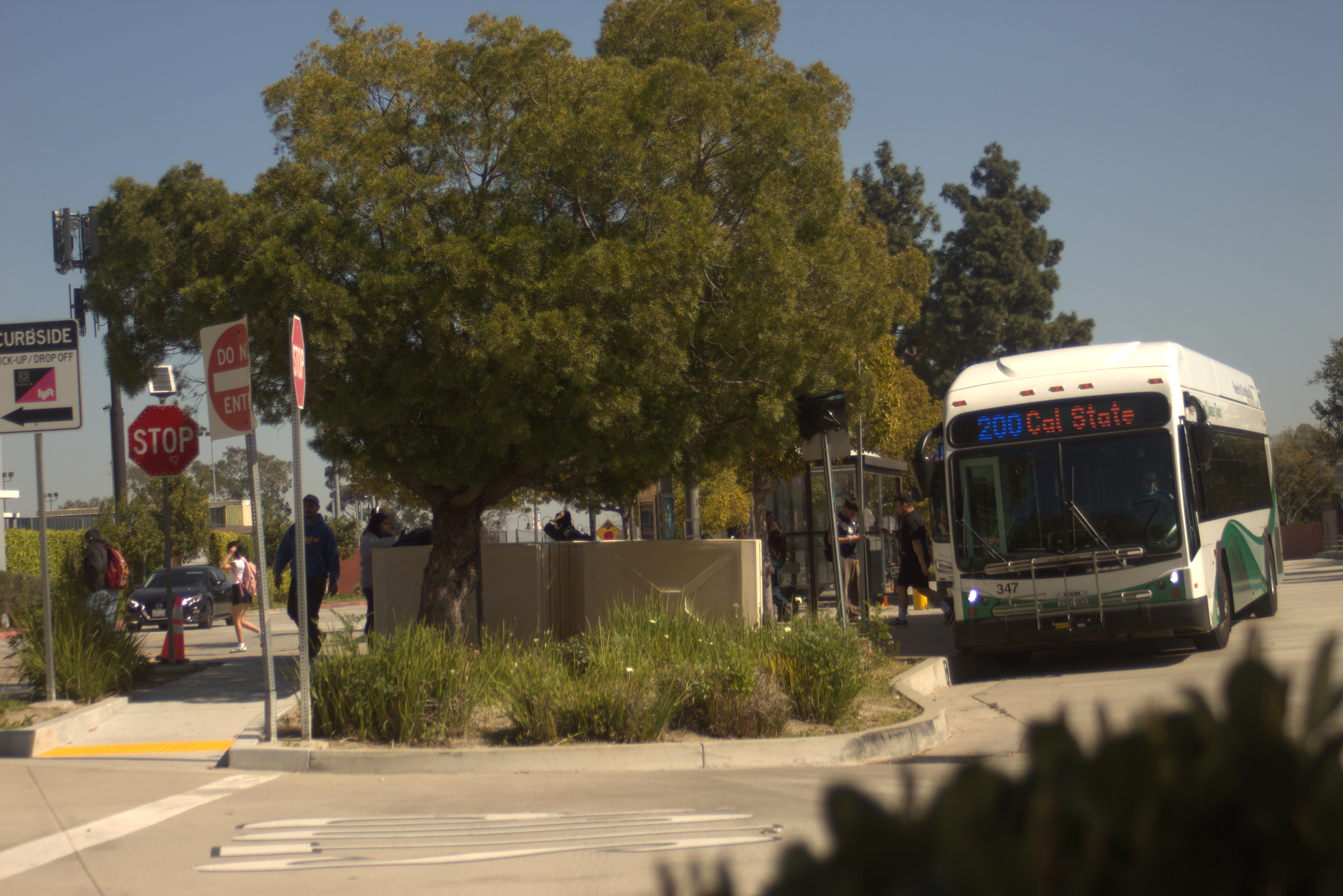
City of Commerce Transit Line 200 stopped at the Cal State LA Transit Center

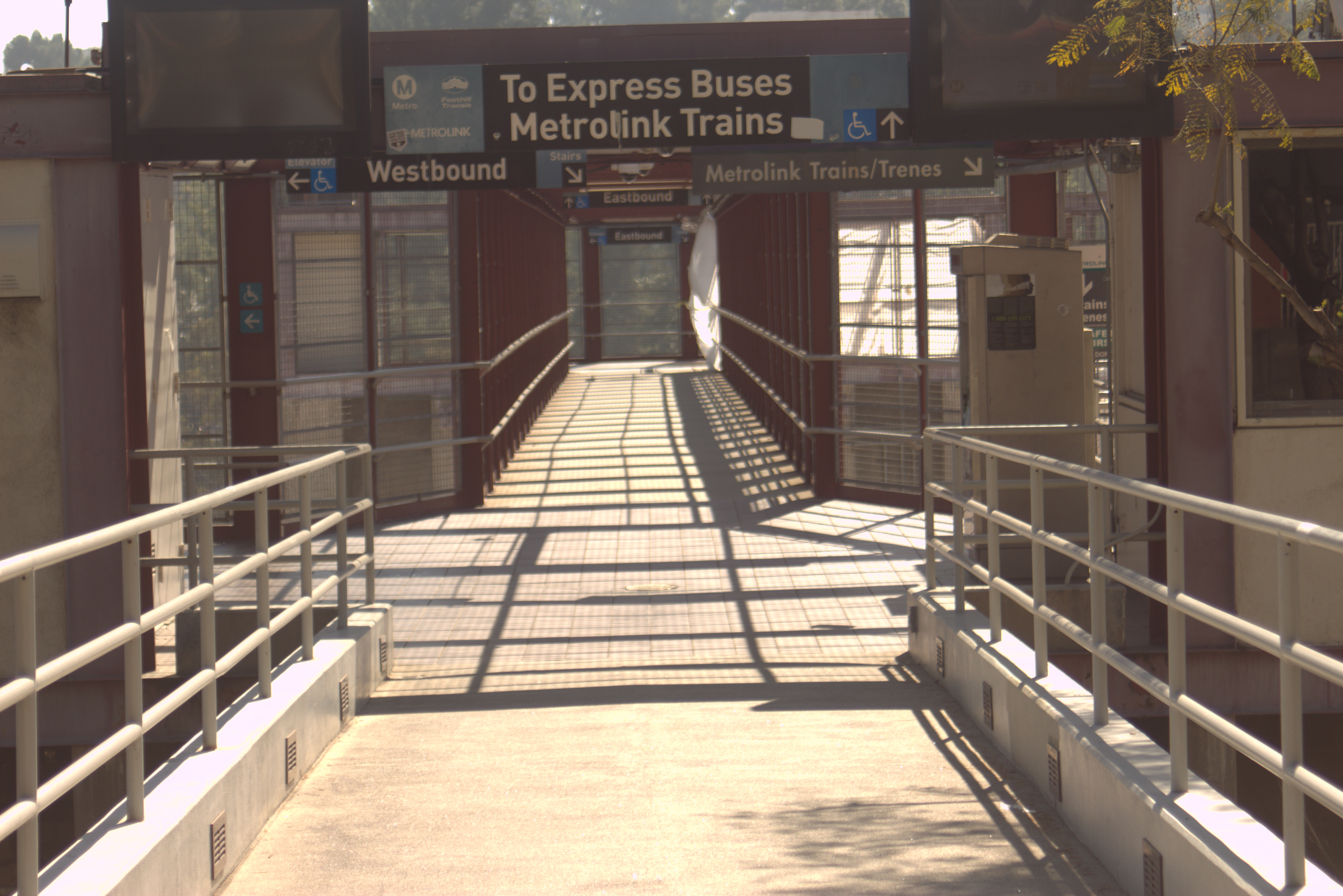
Bridge overpass to Express Busses and Metrolink located on the I-10 Freeway at the Cal State LA Station

== Organization and administration ==
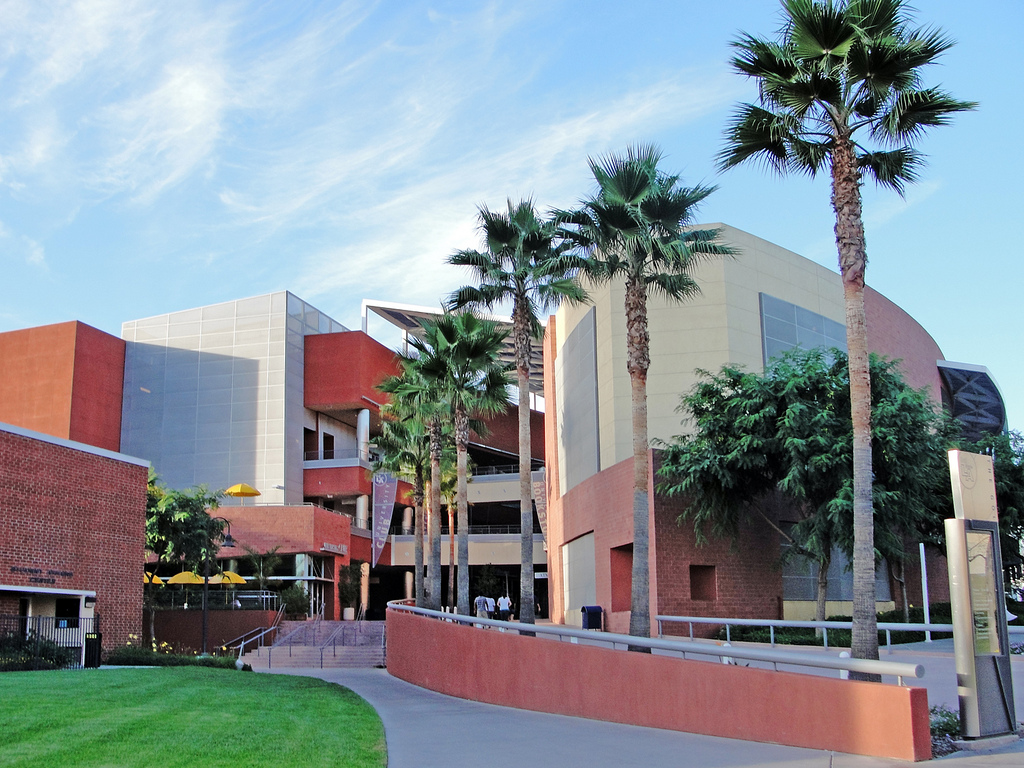
The Golden Eagle, consisting of two adjoining structures separated by a promenade.

Cal State LA is one of 23 campuses in the California State University system. The CSU system is administered by a 25-member board of trustees, which adopts regulations and policies governing the entire system. The system's chief executive officer is Chancellor Mildred García, who has held the role since October 1, 2023, the first Latina to head the CSU system. She succeeded Joseph I. Castro, who resigned in 2022, with Jolene Koester serving as interim chancellor in the interim until García's appointment took effect.

=== University leadership ===
The chief executive of Cal State LA is President Berenecea Johnson Eanes, who succeeded William A. Covino in January 2024. She is the first female president of Cal State LA. The leadership team includes an executive vice president who also serves as chief operating officer and provost, and four vice presidents.

=== Affiliations ===
Cal State LA is a member of the American Association of State Colleges and Universities and the Coalition of Urban and Metropolitan Universities. The latter organization designated Cal State LA in 2018 as one of 33 U.S. universities that serve as "anchor institutions" driving economic growth in their communities.

Cal State LA's College of Business and Economics (CB&E) is divided into six departments: Accounting, Economics & Statistics, Finance Law & Real Estate, Information Systems, Management and Marketing. CB&E is accredited by the Association to Advance Collegiate Schools of Business (AACSB International).

The College of Ethnic Studies, Racial, and Social Transformation opened during the Fall 2020 semester. It houses the university's three ethnic studies departments: Asian and Asian American Studies, Chicana(o) and Latina(o) Studies, and Pan-African Studies.

== Academics ==
Undergraduate admission statistics
	Fall 2025	Fall 2024	Fall 2023	Fall 2022	Fall 2021
First-time Freshmen
Applicants	35,898	32,723	32,748	33,941	29,223
Admits	32,752	29,860	30,106	29,507	26,459
Admit rate	91%	91%	92%	87%	91%
Enrolled	2,938	2,814	3,614	3,892	4,095
Yield rate	9%	9%	12%	13%	15%
Transfers
Applicants	12,986	13,540	13,536	16,464	19,790
Admits	11,248	11,364	11,430	12,850	14,830
Admit rate	87%	84%	84%	78%	75%
Enrolled	2,181	2,215	2,467	2,663	3,911
Yield rate	19%	19%	22%	21%	26%

Cal State LA is accredited by the WASC Senior College and University Commission (WSCUC). Specific programs, such as business (AACSB) and engineering (ABET), also hold specialized accreditations.

The Charter College of Education's Division of Special Education and Counseling has a joint PhD program in Special Education with University of California, Los Angeles, and an independent Ed.D. program in Educational Administration as part of the Division of Applied and Advanced Studies in Education.

Cal State LA's School of Nursing launched the Doctor of Nursing Practice (DNP) in the fall of 2012. The DNP has been accredited by the Western Association of Schools and Colleges (WASC). The Patricia A. Chin School of Nursing, forms part of the Rongxiang Xu College of Health and Human Services. The graduate program offers a nursing education option and nurse-practitioner options in adult gerontology primary care, adult gerontology acute care, family, and family psychiatric/mental health.

With the nation's first Chicano Studies department (established in 1968), Cal State LA is a top source of bachelor's and master's degrees for Hispanic students in California.

The American Historical Association awarded the 2022 Institutional Equity Award to the Department of History at Cal State LA. For recruiting and retaining underrepresented racial and ethnic groups into the historical discipline.

The five most popular majors for 2020 graduates are business, management, marketing, and related support services at 19%; health professions and related programs at 10%; social sciences at 10%; education at 7%; and psychology at 6%.

=== Colleges ===
- Rongxiang Xu College of Health and Human Services
- College of Natural and Social Sciences
- College of Engineering, Computer Science, and Technology
- College of Business and Economics
- College of Education
- College of Arts and Letters
- The Honors College
- College of Professional and Global Education
- College of Ethnic Studies

=== Schools ===
- School of Public Health
- School of Criminal Justice and Criminalistics
- School of Kinesiology, Nutrition, and Food Science
- Patricia A. Chin School of Nursing
- School of Social Work

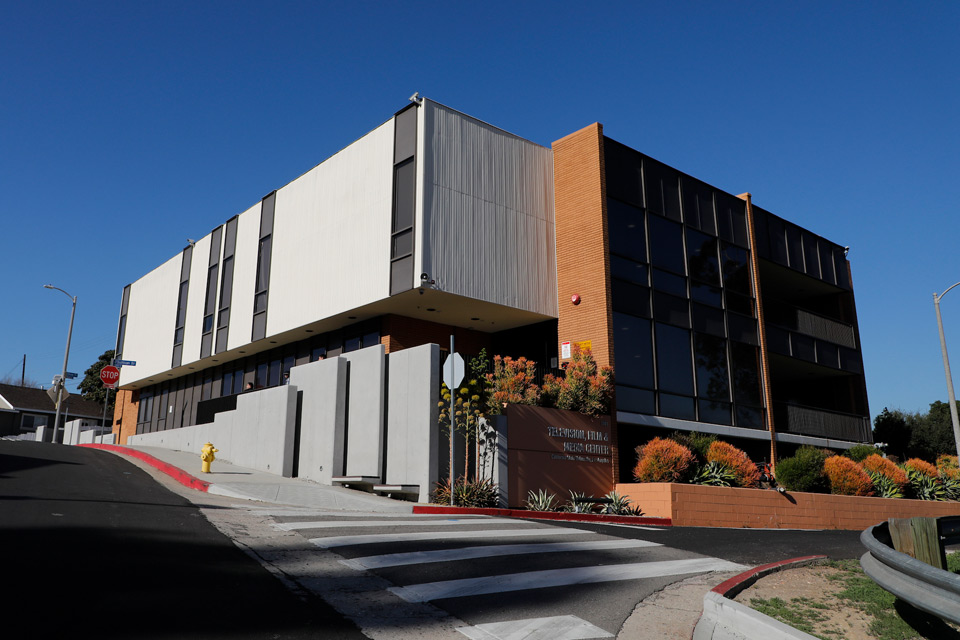
The Television, Film and Media Studies Center

=== Television, Film and Media Studies Center ===
The Television, Film and Media Studies Center houses the Cal State LA Studios part of the College of Arts and Letters.

=== LA BioSpace ===
Created by grants from Los Angeles County and the U.S. Economic Development Administration, LA BioSpace is a university incubator.

LA BioSpace is part of a larger grant project based out of Cal State LA, LABioStart. This project hosts networking events and runs a Bioscience Entrepreneur Boot camp in addition to this incubator.

== Consortia ==
=== Ocean Studies Institute (OSI) ===
Opportunities for study in the coastal environment are provided by the Ocean Studies Institute (OSI), which comprises eight State University campuses: Fullerton, Long Beach, Los Angeles, Northridge, Pomona, San Bernardino, San Marcos and Dominguez Hills. The OSI operates out of the docks and laboratory facilities of the Southern California Marine Institute (SCMI), Fish Harbor, Terminal Island in the Los Angeles–Long Beach Harbor.

The OSI participates in training managers and scientists and educating the public by coordinating and facilitating marine educational and research activities. Seagoing research laboratory and instructional facilities are provided aboard the R. V. Yellowfin, oceangoing research vessel.

Several courses within the departments of Biological Sciences, Geological Sciences, Psychology and the College of Engineering, Computer Science, and Technology, among others, utilize the Yellowfin and other Consortium facilities. In addition, the eight campuses offer a course of study each fall at the USC Wrigley Institute for Environmental Studies on Santa Catalina Island. Courses cover topics in marine biology and ecology, and a research experience.

=== Desert Studies Center ===
The Desert Studies Center is a field station of the California State University located in Zzyzx, California in the Mojave Desert. The purpose of the center is to provide opportunities to conduct research, receive instruction and experience the Mojave Desert environment. Is officially operated by the California Desert Studies Consortium, a consortium of 7 CSU campuses: Fullerton, Cal Poly Pomona, Long Beach, San Bernardino, Northridge, Dominguez Hills and Los Angeles.

== Faculty ==
Cal State Los Angeles' faculty include two presidential award-winning professors and 13 faculty members honored with the CSU Trustees' Outstanding Professor Awards.

=== Professors ===
In December 1999 Raymond Landis, Dean of Engineering and Technology, was honored by the White House for outstanding student mentoring. The recognition earned the university its second presidential award.

In September 1996 chemistry professor Carlos G. Gutiérrez was among the first honorees named by President Bill Clinton to receive the newly established annual Presidential Award for Excellence in Science, Mathematics and Engineering Mentoring, at a White House ceremony.

In fall 1995 chemistry professor Thomas P. Onak, was named California Professor of the Year by the Carnegie Foundation for the Advancement of Teaching and the Council for Advancement and Support of Education.

In 1992 chemistry professor Phoebe K. Dea, was named California Professor of the Year by the Carnegie Foundation for the Advancement of Teaching and the Council for Advancement and Support of Education.

Hal Fishman served as an assistant adjunct professor of political science for two years. Fishman won the Associated Press Television-Radio Association's first-ever Lifetime Achievement Award for his work as a Los Angeles local (KTLA) news anchor.

Ann Garry, professor emerita of Philosophy; early pioneer of the field of feminist philosophy.

=== Distinguished Visiting Adjunct Professors ===
- Christopher Isherwood taught a course on Modern English Literature in 1961–1962. A noted author his Berlin Stories was the basis for the Broadway musical and film, Cabaret.
- Dorothy Parker taught a course in the English department in 1962–1963. Parker, a writer and founding member of the Algonquin Round Table, was inducted into the American Academy of Arts and Letters in 1959.

=== Trustee Professors ===
- Barry Munitz, fifth chancellor of the California State University system, and sixth president of the University of Houston

== Rankings ==
Academic rankings

Master's
- Washington Monthly: 3

Regional
- U.S. News & World Report: 15

National
- Forbes: 227
- WSJ/College Pulse: 401–500

2024–25 USNWR Best Regional Colleges West Rankings
Top Performers on Social Mobility	5
Top Public Schools	8
Best Value Schools	26
Best Undergraduate Engineering Programs	40 (At schools where doctorate not offered)
Civil Engineering	11
Computer Engineering	11
Nursing	96

2024–25 USNWR Graduate School Rankings
Program	Ranking
Nursing Masters	30
Public Health	51
Fine Arts	53
Social Work	60
Rehabilitation Counseling	64
Speech–Language Pathology	92
Public Affairs	96

The 2021 U.S. News & World Report's "America's Best Colleges" issue included the following rankings for Cal State LA in the category of regional universities in the Western United States: tied for 9th among public universities, tied for 26th among public and private universities, and ranked 11th in Best Value Schools. The business program in the College of Business and Economics continues to be one of the top 10 in California among public institutions. In a separate category, Cal State LA's undergraduate computer science program is ranked among the top 20 in California.

Nurse.org ranked Cal State La 5th on its Top 10 Nursing Schools in California ranking 2021.

Washington Monthly's 2020 College Ranking Guide named Cal State LA 10th out of 614 schools nationally in the Master's University category. The magazine rates universities based on their contribution to the public good, considering factors that include research, service and social mobility. Also in the 2020 issue by Washington Monthly, Cal State LA ranked 3rd for "Best Bang for the Buck" out of 215 schools in the U.S. Western region.

Money ranked Cal State LA 31st for Best Colleges for Engineering Majors and 31st in its evaluation of its 2020 Best Colleges ranking.

Business Insider ranked Cal State LA #12 for its Best Return on Investment Business Insider 2020 rankings.

Forbes ranked Cal State LA 139th in its 2019 ranking of America's Best Value Colleges out of the 300 universities that were included.

CollegeNET ranked Cal State LA #2 Social Mobility Index.

In 2018, Cal State LA was ranked the 14th top college in the United States by Payscale and CollegeNET's Social Mobility Index college rankings.

In January 2017, Cal State LA was ranked #1 in the country for the upward mobility of students. The Equality of Opportunity Project followed 30 million students enrolled at over 2,200 colleges and universities, from 1999 to 2013, and concluded that the institution with the highest "mobility rate" was Cal State LA.

Cal State LA was ranked 8th in the nation in the amount of B.A. degrees awarded in 2017 to Hispanics by Hispanic Outlook on Education Magazine.

In 2014, Cal State LA was listed as one of Time magazine's top 100 colleges and universities, according to new criteria proposed by the White House that is based solely on accessibility, affordability, and graduation rate. Ranked at #24, Cal State LA is one of the seven CSU campuses that made the list.

The National Science Foundation lists Cal State LA as the top baccalaureate institution of origin for Latino science and engineering Ph.D. recipients among all undergraduate and master's colleges and universities in the continental U.S. The most recent findings cover 2008 through 2012 and were published in the NSF report, Women, Minorities, and Persons with Disabilities in Science and Engineering: 2015. The data come from surveys conducted by the NSF, the U.S. Department of Education, the U.S. Department of Commerce, and the U.S. Department of Labor.

== Engineering competitions ==
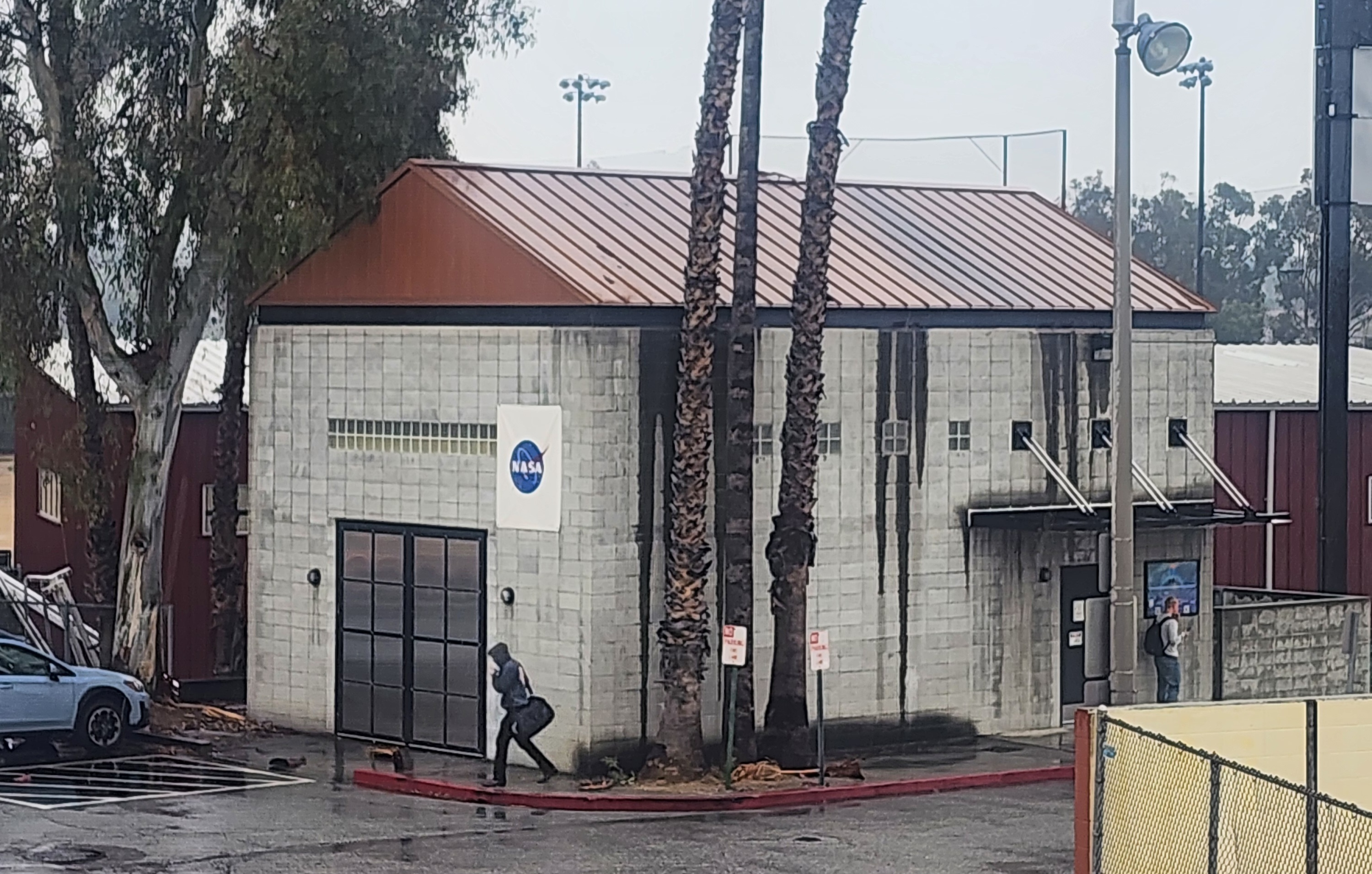
The SPACE laboratory, which stands for Structures, Propulsion, and Control Engineering, opened in 2003 for the study of aerospace technology and space science enterprise. It was the first and only one of its kind established on a CSU campus.

Founded in 1953 as the Department of Engineering, today's College of Engineering, Computer Science and Technology (ECST) was established in 2001. ECST was funded by NASA to advance aerospace technology and space research. Cal State LA's NASA University Research Center is the only one of its kind in the state of California. The objective of the program is to design and build a segmented reflector test-bed. The College of Engineering and Technology added the Department of Computer Science and officially became the College of Engineering, Computer Science, and Technology in June 2001.

Cal State LA's College of Engineering, Computer Science, and Technology is divided into five departments: the Departments of Civil Engineering, Computer Science, Electrical and Computer Engineering, Mechanical Engineering, and Technology. Collectively, these departments offer 12 undergraduate programs, four graduate programs and two teaching credentials in collaboration with the Charter College of Education.

=== The Solar Eagle ===
The college has achieved international recognition with its advanced vehicles. Cal State LA's Team Solar Eagle has built three cars that competed in solar car races in the United States and Australia, winning a national championship at the American Solar Challenge in 1997. The 1997 champion Solar Eagle III was the first solar and only Hot Wheels reproduction of a student-built vehicle. The Solar Eagle II is on display at the California Science Center in Los Angeles it place third in the nation. Cal State LA's Solar Eagle, the first solar-powered electric car designed and built by Engineering and Technology students, placed fourth in the nation and is first among California competitors in the transcontinental GM Sunrayce USA. The Solar Eagle is in display at the Cal State LA's Engineering, Computer Science and Technology building lobby.

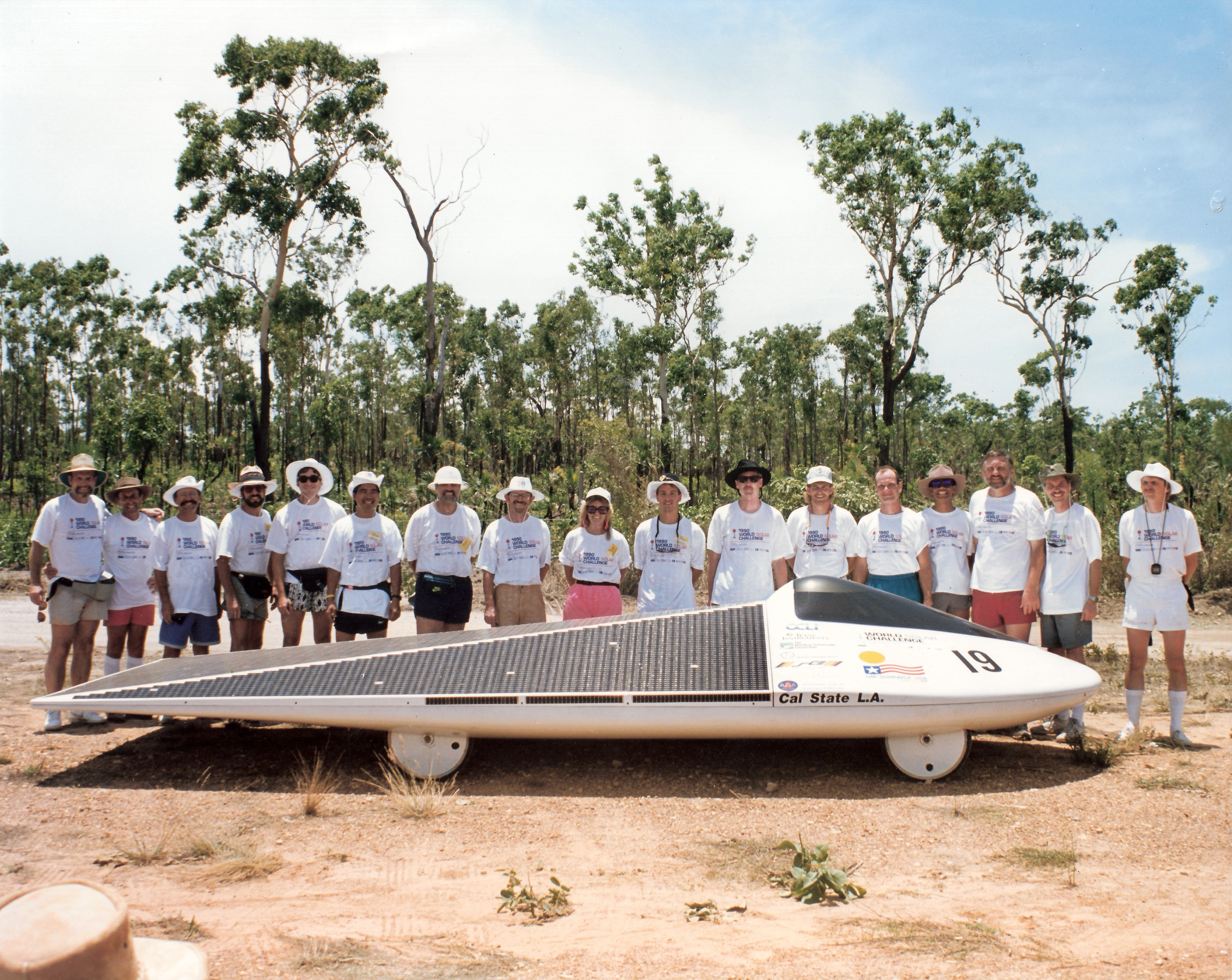
World Solar Challenge
Darwin Australia

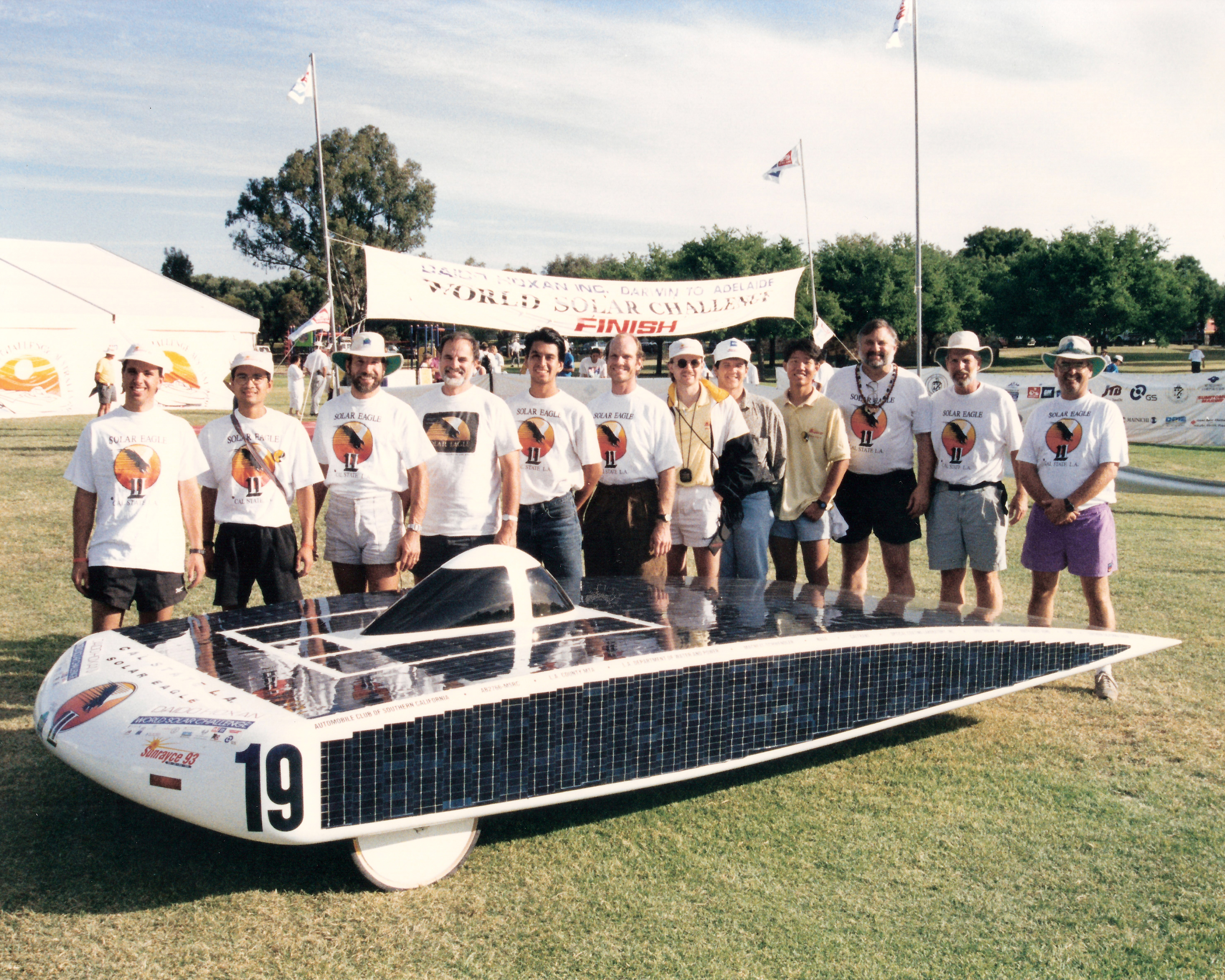
World Solar Challenge
Adelaide, Australia

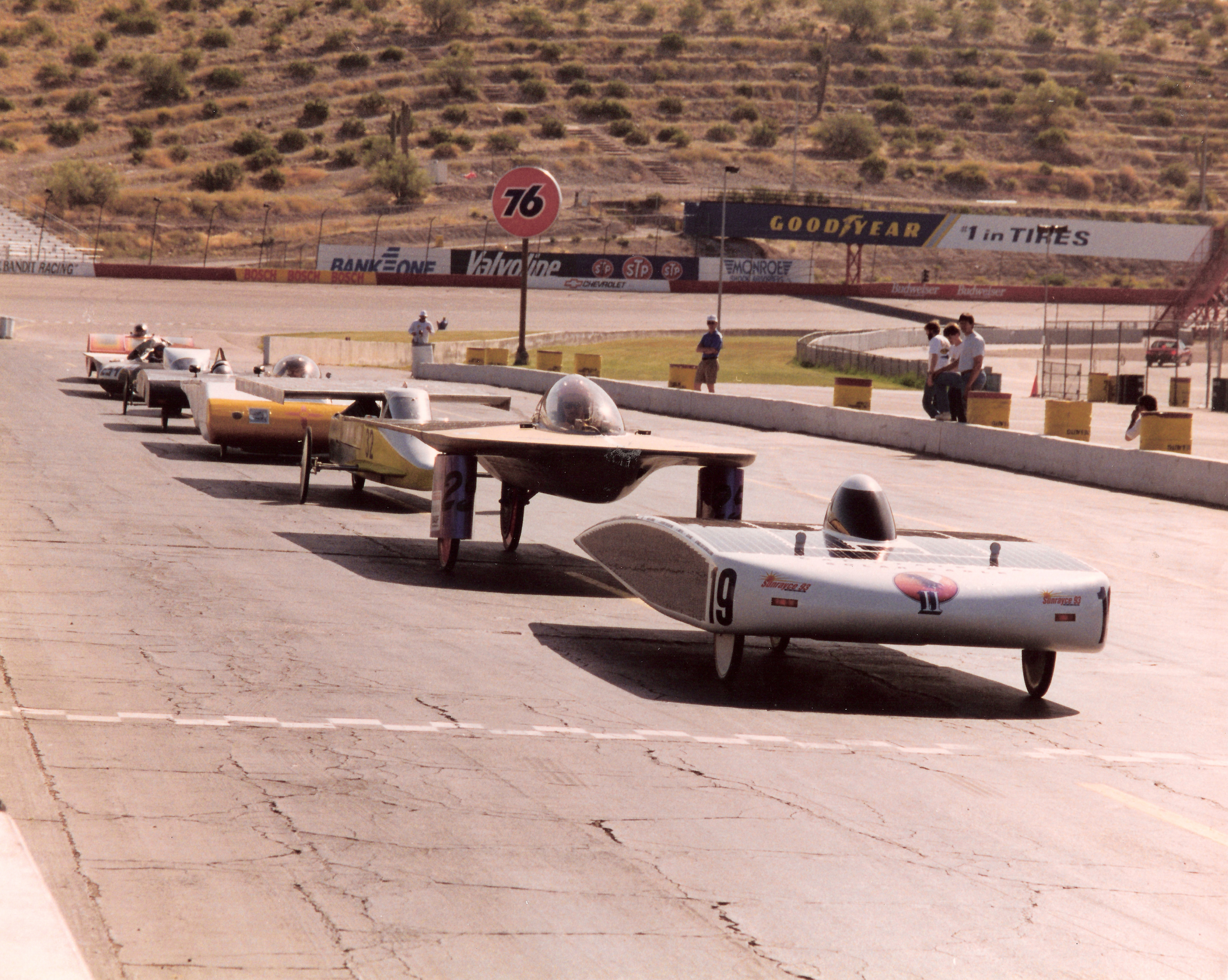
Solar Eagle II

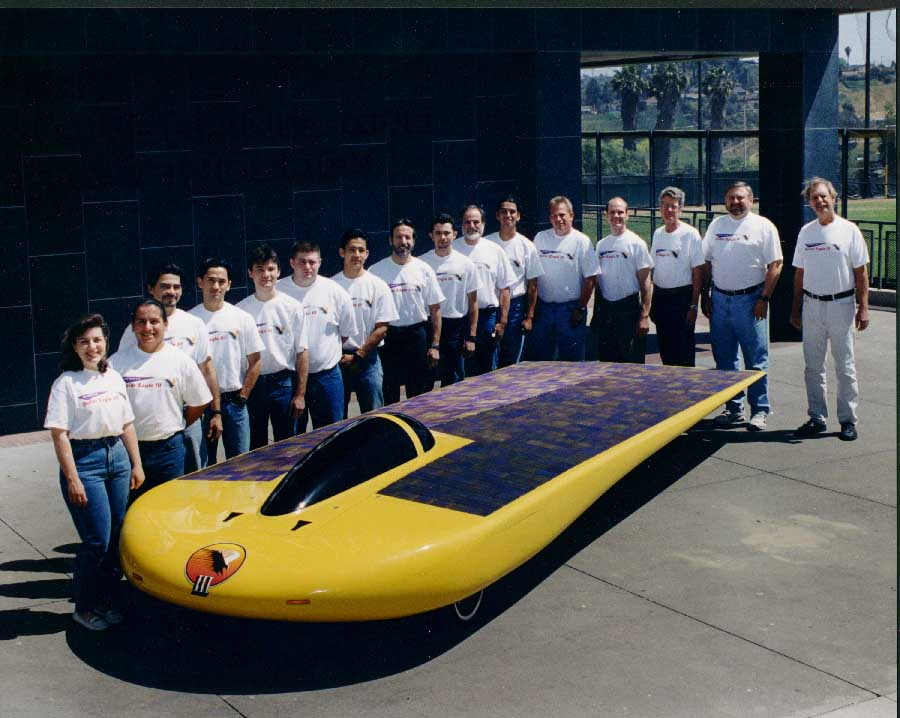
Solar Eagle III National Champions

=== EcoCar competitions ===
In April 2011, Cal State LA was chosen to become part of the 3-year AVTC EcoCAR2: Plugging into the Future competition managed by Argonne National Laboratory and sponsored by the US Department of Energy and General Motors. EcoCAR2 tasks 15 universities to modify a Chevrolet Malibu into a plug-in hybrid while maintaining safety and consumer acceptability. The university has chosen a parallel-through-the-road architecture as part of the competition. The competition is a collaboration between the College of Engineering, Computer Science, and Technology and the College of Business and Economics, with Engineering handling the design and implementation of the vehicle systems and the Business handling budgeting, fundraising and promotion of the program.

In May 2013, Cal State LA's EcoCAR 2 team came home 2nd place overall in Year Two of the EcoCAR 2: Plugging In to the Future collegiate engineering competition.

Continuing their participation in AVTCs, Cal State LA is involved with General Motors' new competition series called EcoCAR3. This is a four-year competition where 16 universities across northern America were donated a 2016 Chevy Camaro and are focused on converting this traditional fossil fuel vehicle into a plug-in hybrid electric vehicle. Cal State LA's team has focused on developing a post-transmission parallel architecture for their vehicle. Additionally, the team has decided to deviate from the standard expectation of marketing their developed vehicle to consumers and is instead targeting law enforcement fleets as a business to business focus. The EcoCar3 team will have four years (2014–18) to redesign and re-engineer a Chevy Camaro in an effort to reduce the energy consumption and greenhouse emissions of the vehicle, while maintaining consumer acceptability, performance, utility and safety. At the end of the four years, the student-built vehicles will participate in an over-the-road event, raising the stakes for vehicle, dependability and safety.

=== AVTC competitions ===
In August 2006 Cal State LA became the first university west of the Mississippi and second overall to achieve successful flight powered by fuel cells. The unmanned aerial vehicle was developed by a team of mechanical engineering students working in Cal State LA's Multidisciplinary Flight dynamics and Control Laboratory (MFDCLab).

== Programs ==
=== Early Entrance Program ===
The Early Entrance Program (EEP) is an early college entrance program for gifted individuals of middle school and high school ages. The unique educational program is specifically designed to permit young, highly gifted students to enroll in college as full-time students. The Early Entrance Program was established at California State University, Los Angeles in 1982. The program allows qualified students as young as 12 years of age the opportunity to excel at the university level. The program maintains a population of approximately 130 full-time highly gifted teenaged students known as "EEPsters." Every year, approximately 100 academically gifted students from all over the United States apply to EEP, with around 30 applicants admitted. Students must achieve a minimum score of 550 on the evidence-based reading and writing section and 570 on the mathematics section of the SAT; or at least a 22 in English and a 23 in mathematics on the ACT. After a preliminary interview with the EEP director, prospective students must also undergo a rigorous assessment period called a Provisional Quarter (or "Provie Summer") before final admission.

=== Forensic sciences ===
Cal State LA's growing forensic science program has been a part of the university curriculum since the founding of the school. It is home to one of the few and the longest-operating graduate Criminal Justice and Criminalistics program west of the Mississippi River, located in the new Los Angeles Regional Crime Lab. The new Hertzberg-Davis Forensic Science Center, which was dedicated on May 11, 2007, jointly house the LAPD's Scientific Investigation Division, the L.A. County Sheriff's Department Scientific Services Bureau and Cal State LA Criminal Justice and Criminalistics programs.

=== Sea floor engineering ===
Cal State LA also has a comprehensive seafloor-engineering program. Research is conducted at the Naval Facilities Engineering Service Center in Port Hueneme, California. In 2003, Civil engineering professor Mark Tufenkjian led Cal State LA to receive over half a million dollars in grant money. The award of $594,253 is the largest grant ever received by Cal State LA's Department of Civil Engineering.

=== Cal State LA Experiential Learning ===
The Cal State LA spring water (bottled water), sold on campus, is the result of a partnership between the university's administration and the College of Business and Economics. Together the two branches of the university worked together to develop a product that would appeal to the student body and be affordable. The college has developed "experiential" learning projects, which students participate in during their final years of schooling. Other projects have included the Volunteer Income Tax Assistance Program, where students complete tax returns for small businesses and low-income community members, marketing and site selection research for the Rocky Mountain Chocolate Factory and a case study for American Apparel.

== Campus media ==
=== University Times ===
The University Times (UT) is a student-run newspaper. The first student newspaper, at that time called The College Times, was published in June 1948 for the first time. In 1965 The College Times was named the best newspaper by California Intercollegiate Press. On October 2, 1972 The College Times changed its name to University Times, in accordance with the change in university status. The name was the popular result of a campus-wide poll, with "Devil's Advocate" coming in second. Larry Hawthorne was the first editor-in-chief of the University Times.

=== Golden Eagle Radio ===
This webcast station started in 2015.

=== Golden Eagle Productions ===
Golden Eagle Productions (also known as GEP) is Cal State LA's primary film and television unit, composed of students creating and producing media content such as news and digital pieces, as well as original films and series.

== Greek life ==
Phi Sigma Kappa fraternity house near California State University, Los Angeles, featuring the fraternity's Greek letters (ΦΣΚ) above its entrance.

Excluding the Greek Council and Order of Omega, as of the summer of 2019, the Cal State LA Campus is home to 25 social fraternal organization chapters, 10 fraternities (two new colonies), 13 sororities, and 2 co-ed fraternities.

== Intercollegiate athletics ==
Cal State LA Sports Programs
Women's sports	Men's sports
Basketball	Baseball
Soccer	Basketball
Tennis	Soccer
Cross-country	Cross-country
Volleyball	Track and field (outdoor)
Beach Volleyball
Golf
Track and field^{†}
† – Track and field includes both indoor and outdoor.

The Golden Eagles are members of the California Collegiate Athletic Association (CCAA) for all sports except women's tennis, which is in the Pacific West Conference, and women's beach volleyball and Indoor Track & Field, which are in the NCAA Division II independent schools. Cal State LA is the only CCAA University who has beach volleyball as a sport. Cal State LA competes in the Division II level of the National Collegiate Athletic Association (NCAA). Prior to January, 1981, Cal State LA was known as the Diablos; the change to Golden Eagles was made by then-President James Rosser to create a more inclusive, less stereotypical mascot.

The university fields as of 2019 fourteen intercollegiate teams for men or women in soccer, baseball, basketball, tennis, golf, volleyball, cross country, indoor track, and outdoor track and field. Cal State LA's more than 11 acres (4.5 ha) athletic facility is named the Billie Jean King Sports Complex. The sports complex—which was approved by the CSU Board of Trustees in September 2010—features the Eagle's Nest Arena, the University Stadium, Jesse Owens Track and Field, Reeder Field (baseball), the swimming pool, and tennis and basketball courts. Development project plans for the complex include a new gym, athletic field and the Rosie Casals / Pancho Gonzales tennis center. The center is a new two-story building which will include locker and training rooms on the ground floor with multi-use space and viewing areas on the second floor. It is 7,000 sq. ft. Completion date of fall 2021.

The Eagles Nest is home to the Cal State LA basketball and volleyball teams. The arena seats just over 3,200 fans at full capacity. In 1984, the Eagles Nest hosted the Summer XXIII (23rd) Olympics judo competition. In July 1984 the Olympic mural, Olympic Fantasy, a mosaic tile work by muralist Guillermo "Bill" Granizo, was installed on west side of the arena in remembrance of the event.

Los Angeles Football Club (LAFC) of Major League Soccer selected Cal State LA in 2017 as the home of its new training facility, soccer operations headquarters, and youth academy.

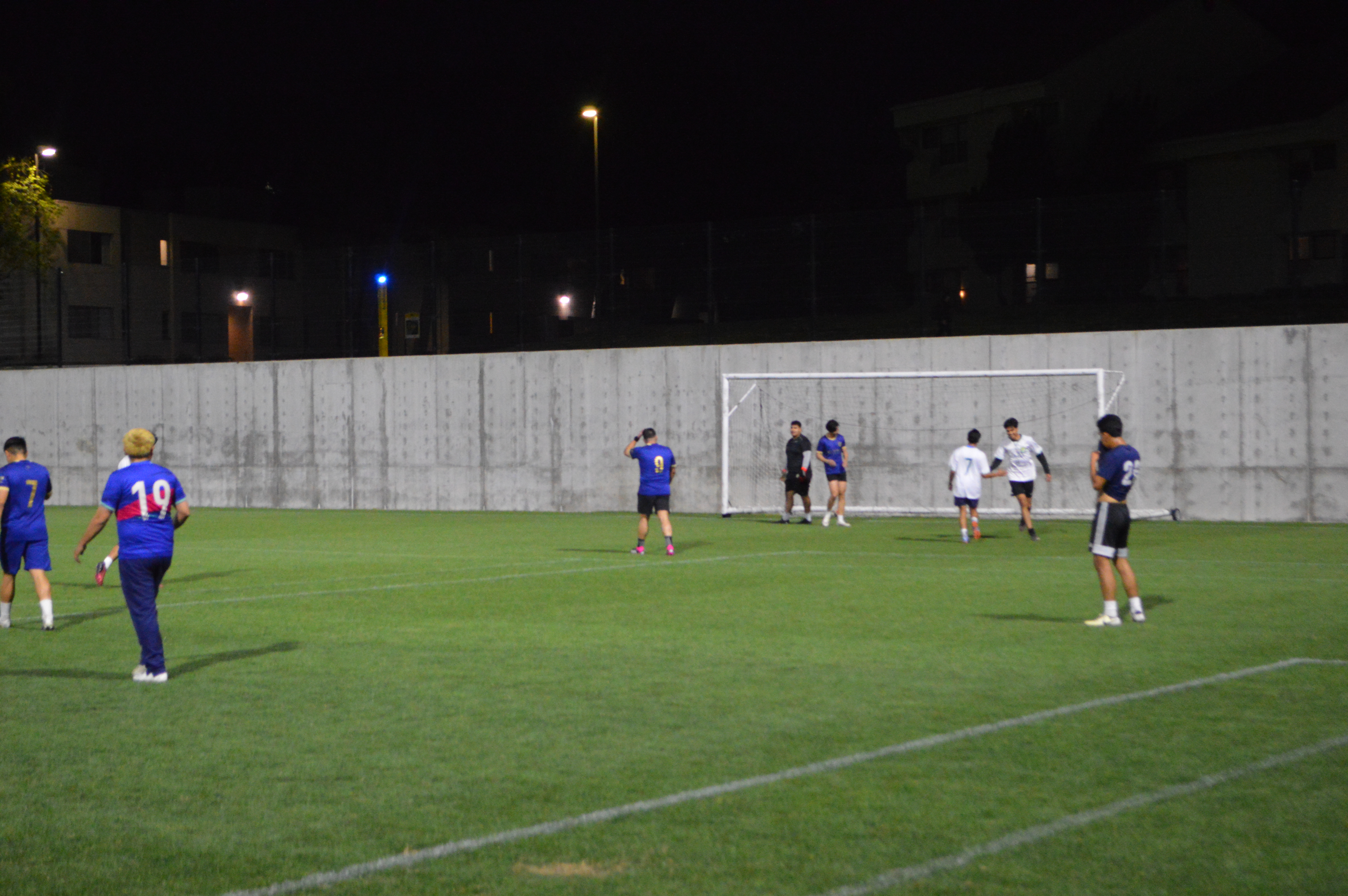
CSULA intramurals

LAFC trains on the site at the northern gateway of the campus, though it plays its games at BMO Stadium, which opened in 2018 in Exposition Park in South Los Angeles. The arrangement with Cal State LA was approved by the California State University Board of Trustees.

Entering the 2017–2018 school year, Cal State LA has won a total of 75 conference championships in the university's history. This is in addition to the eighth national championships and 10 national runner-up finishes. Besides being located in close proximity to each other, Cal Poly Pomona and Cal State LA have competed heavily as conference rivals.

In 2021 Cal State LA men's soccer won the first national championship in program history. The national championship is the eighth from any sport in school history and Cal State LA's first since 1981.

The surface parking lots immediately south across Hellman Avenue were replaced with soccer fields. These South Fields will be used by the university students, including students living in the existing student residence halls on site, and supports the Athletics Department programs. The North Field is anticipated to be used as a training soccer field by a major league soccer team, and will also be used as a training field by the community youth soccer organizations.

On Monday July 22, 2024 The Cal State LA Golden Eagles 2023 Women's volleyball team, along with other national champions from the previous academic year, was honored at the White House as part of NCAA Sports Day. The event featured Vice President Kamala Harris and NCAA Senior Vice President of Championships Lynda Tealer, who recognized the accomplishments of the winning teams. Shelby Grubbs, a senior member of the Golden Eagles, reflected on the event's significance, highlighting the team's historic achievement of securing their first national title despite entering the playoffs unranked.

- Men's Tennis Team titles: 1963, 1964, 1965
- Football: 1964 (#1 on the UPI poll)
- Men's Track and Field: 1978
- Men's Archery: 1979
- Women's Badminton: 1981
- Men's Soccer: 2021
- Women's volleyball: 2023

== Symbols ==
=== University Seal ===
The university seal is reserved for legal, formal and ceremonial purposes, including commencement materials, diplomas, transcripts, formal events, presidential documents and gift items from the President's Office. The seal, available in full-color or black-and-white, cannot be used in combination with the Cal State LA logo.

=== University Mace ===
The university Mace is a ceremonial piece symbolizing the authority under which the university is chartered. It is identified with the Office of the President and is carried in academic processions for commencements and other official university gatherings. The honor of serving as mace-bearer is accorded to the Chair of the Academic Senate.

=== University Badge ===
The shield represents the enterprising, global city in which it resides. Inside the shield, there are iconic buildings and landmarks from the Los Angeles skyline. They are drawn to scale and ascend upward, from left to right, pointing toward the future. The thick bordure (outer edge of the shield) has open corners that represent a campus that opens out to the region it serves. The 'A' in Cal State LA, features an eagle's beak at its tip.

== Future developments ==
Administration and Student Affairs Building Abatement and Demolition

Plans and specifications for the abatement and demolition of the Administration and Student Affairs Buildings are being designed. The overall scope will be to demolish the buildings including their foundations.

== Notable alumni ==
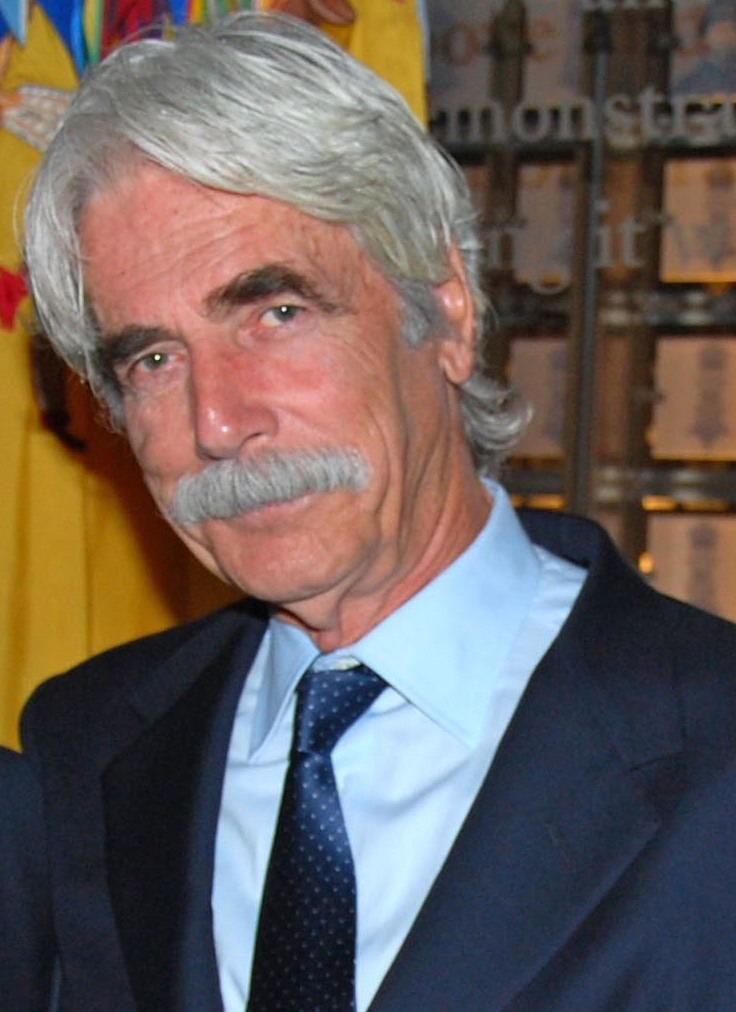
Sam Elliott

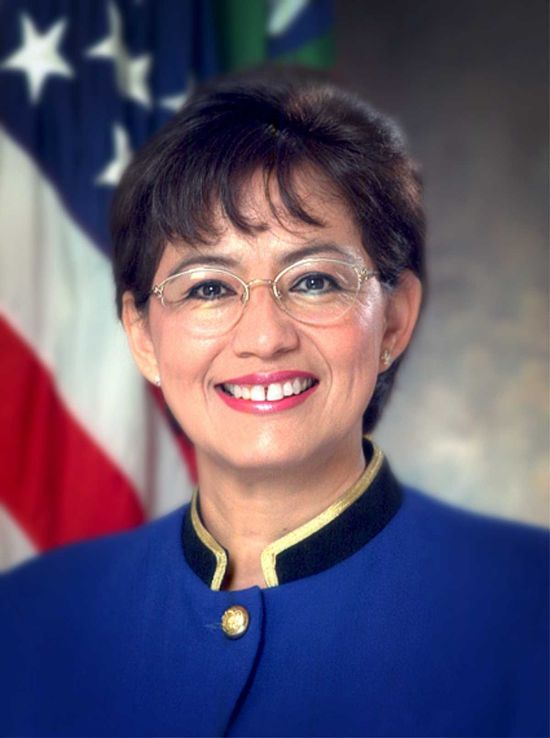
Rosario Marin

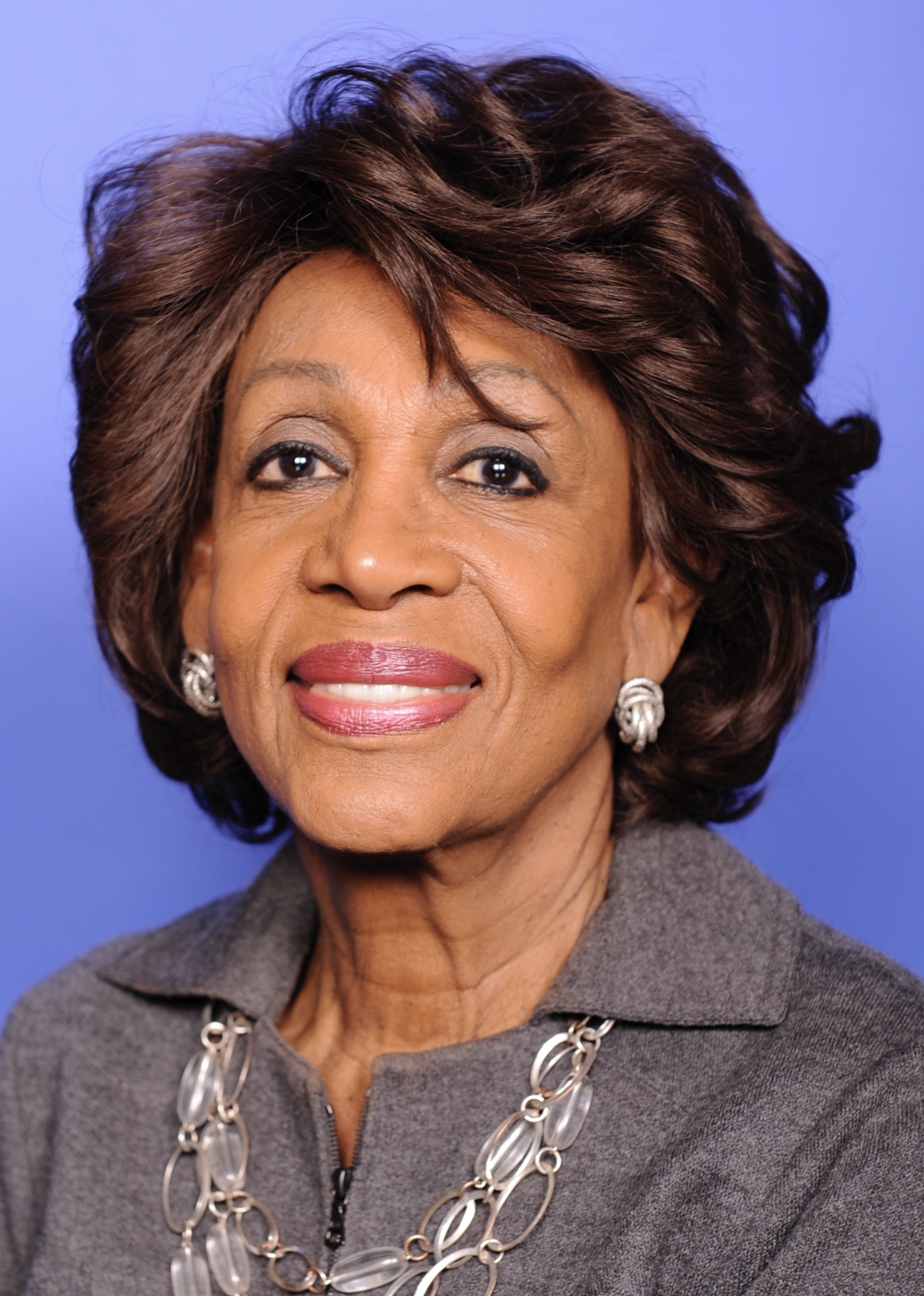
Maxine Waters

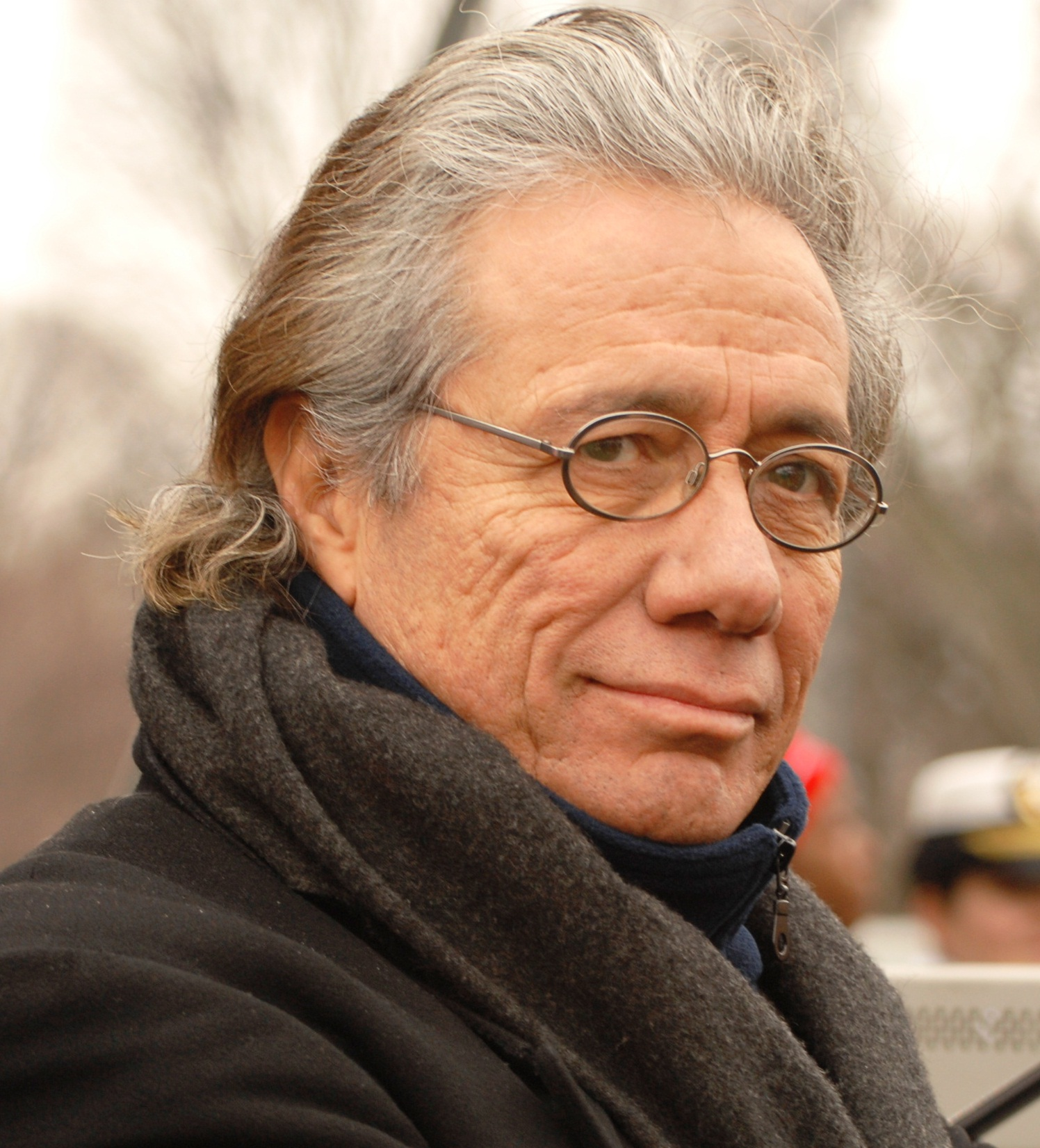
Edward James Olmos

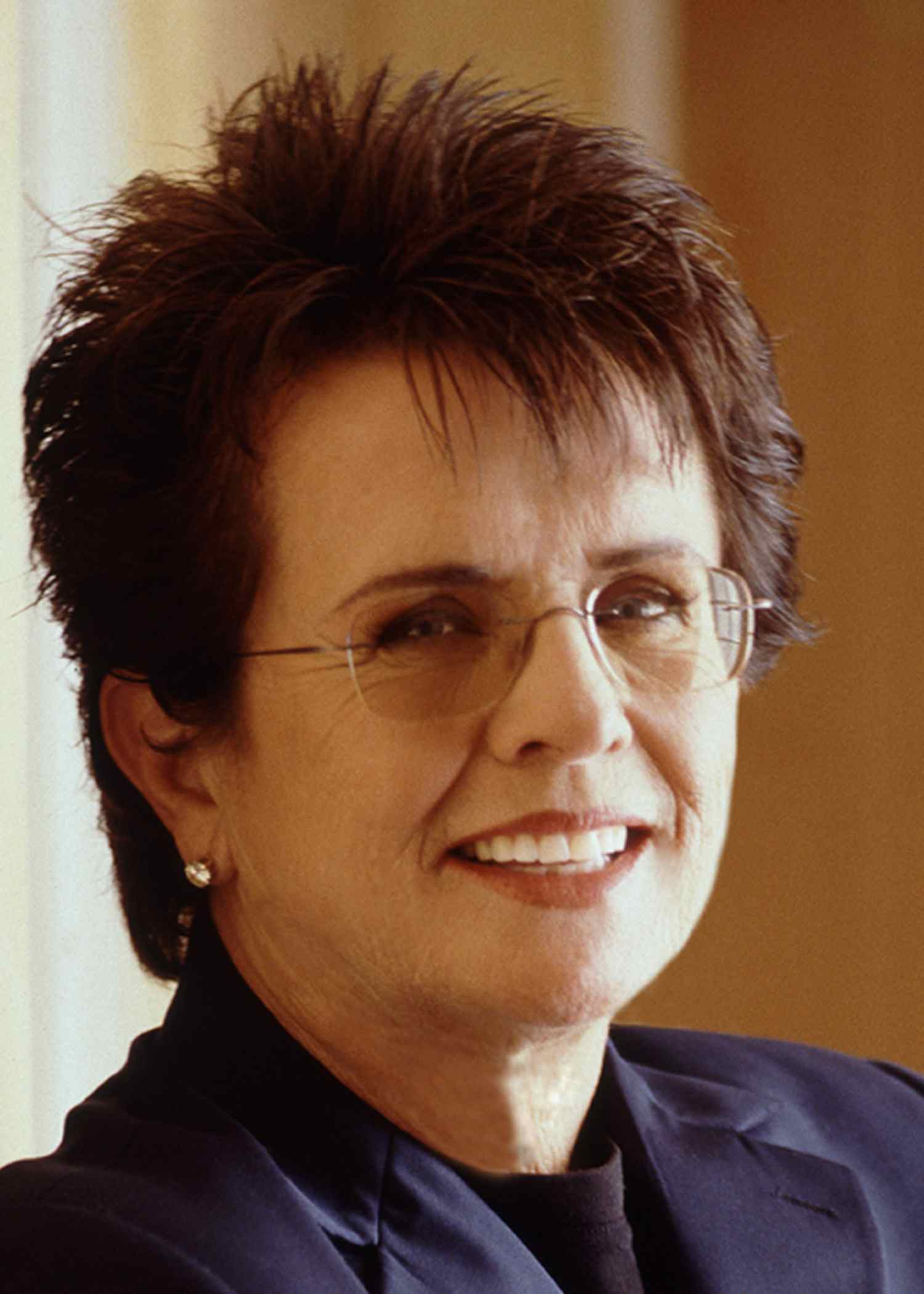
Billie Jean King

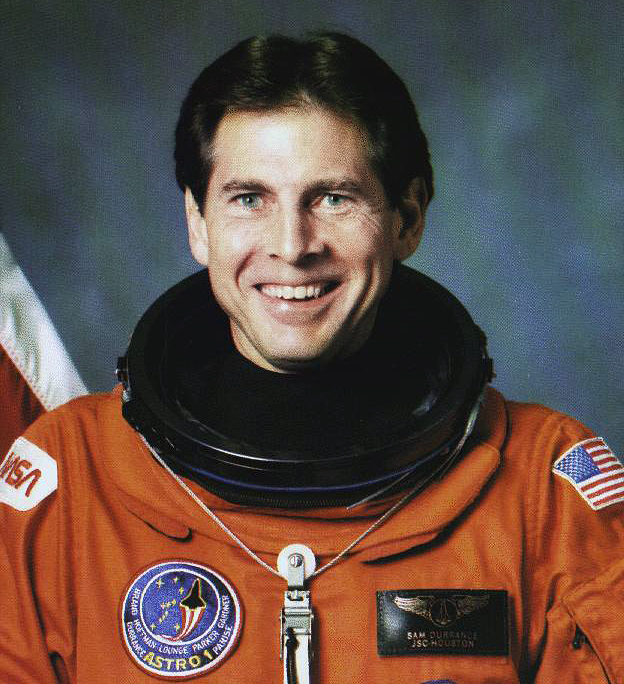
Samuel Durrance

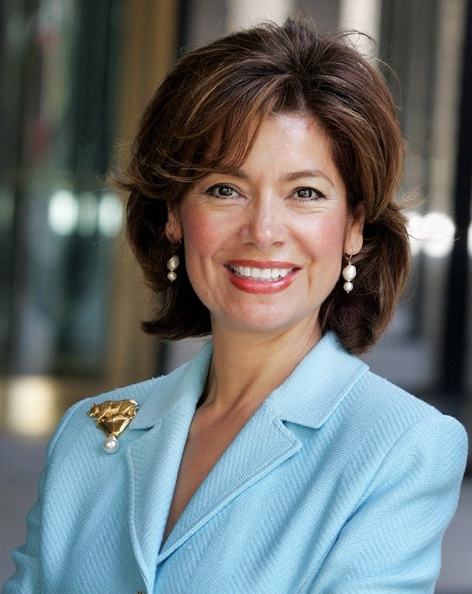
Maria Contreras-Sweet

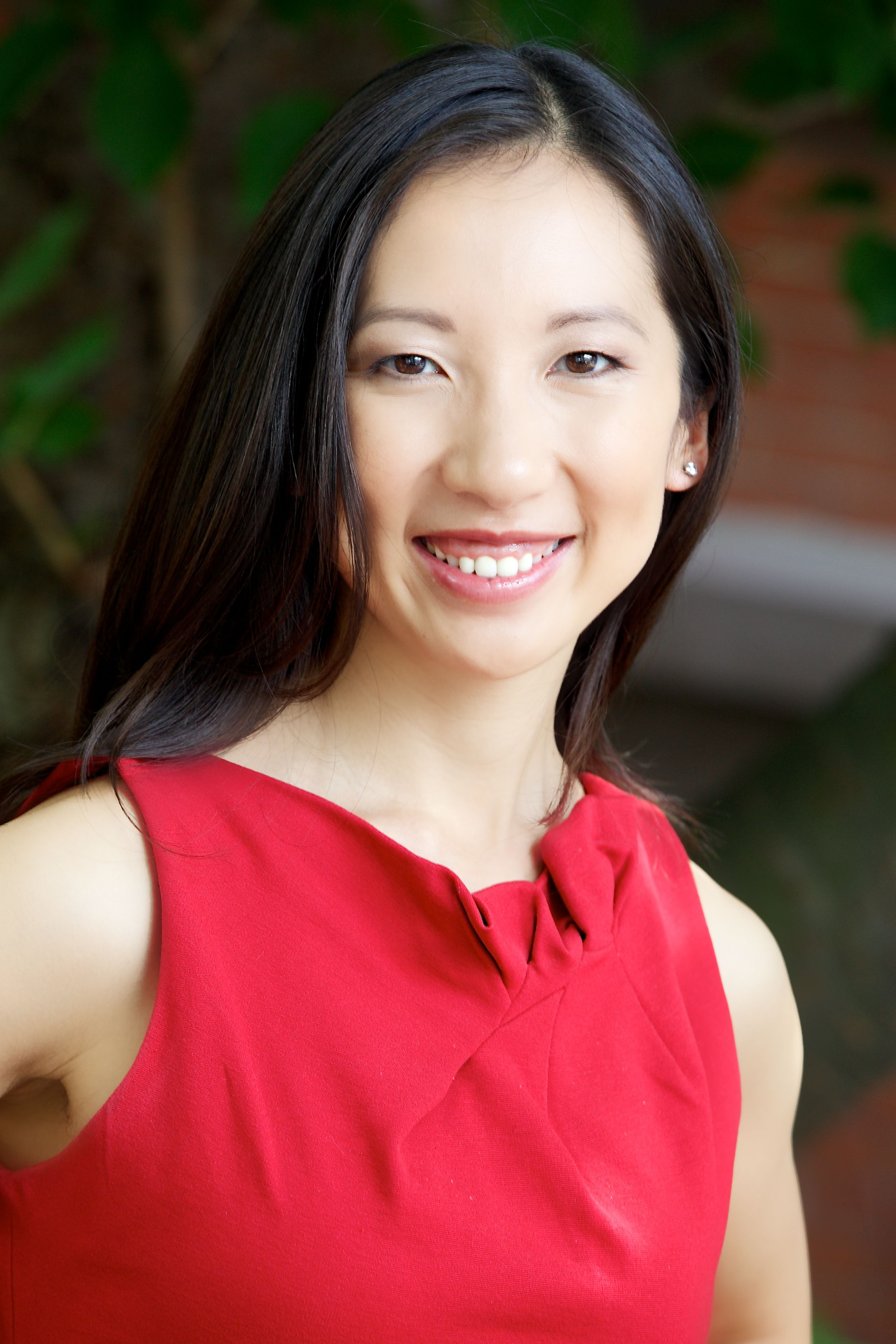
Leana Wen

== See also ==
- Ernest E. Debs, Assembly member who sponsored bill establishing the university
- Hispanic Serving Institution
