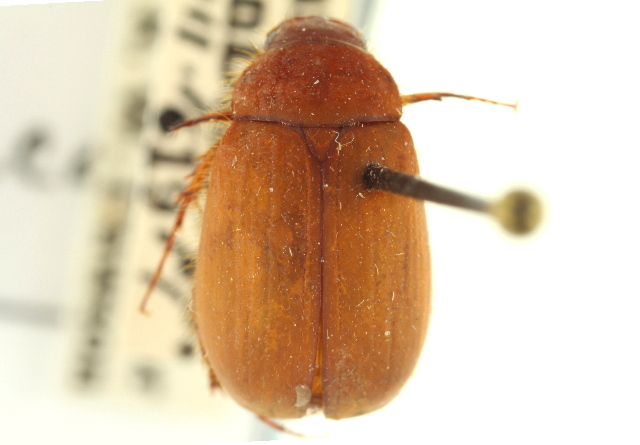

Scientific classification
- Kingdom: Animalia
- Phylum: Arthropoda
- Class: Insecta
- Order: Coleoptera
- Suborder: Polyphaga
- Infraorder: Scarabaeiformia
- Family: Scarabaeidae
- Genus: Serica
- Species: S. cuyamaca

Binomial name
- Serica cuyamaca Saylor, 1939

= Serica cuyamaca =

Species of beetle

Serica cuyamaca is a species of beetle of the family Scarabaeidae. It is found in the United States (California).

== Description ==
Adults reach a length of about 7–8.5 mm. They are dull piceo-castaneous, with a slight pruinose vestiture. The dorsal surface has sparse, erect, and scattered hairs.

== Life history ==
Adults have been recorded feeding on Rosa californica and the flowers of Eriogonum fasciculatum.
