= Southern California Marine Institute =

Research facility in California, US

Coordinates: 33.735969°N 118.270158°W

Southern California Marine Institute (SCMI)
- Founded: May 1993
- Founder: Lon McClanahan; Don Newman
- Type: Non-operating private foundation (IRS exemption status): 501(c)(3)
- Location: Terminal Island
- Origins: Ocean Studies Institute (OSI)
- Region served: Southern California, United States
- Method: Donations and Grants
- Website: scmi.net

The Southern California Marine Institute (SCMI) is a multi-campus research facility and non-profit oceanographic institution headquartered in Terminal Island, California.

== History ==
In the late 1960s, marine scientists working at six campuses of the CSU system in the Los Angeles Basin (Dominguez Hills, Fullerton, Long Beach, Los Angeles, Northridge, and Cal Poly Pomona) proposed the formation of an institute that would provide the advancement of marine programs. It was until 1971, when the university system decided to purchase the naval vessel R/V Nautilus for that specific purpose. In 1972, the creation of the Southern California Ocean Studies Consortium (SCOSC) was approved by the Trustees and the Presidents of the founding campuses and the operation of the R/V Nautilus floating marine laboratory began.

The University of California Los Angeles is in partnership with the Institute, thereby increasing marine research in Los Angeles, and providing educational opportunities for its students.

== Membership ==
The eleven institutions in the Southern California Marine Institute consortium are:

- Cal Poly Pomona
- Cal State Fullerton
- Cal State Long Beach
- Cal State Northridge
- CSU Dominguez Hills
- CSU Los Angeles
- CSU San Bernardino
- CSU San Marcos
- Occidental College
- UCLA
- USC - (USC Wrigley Institute for Environmental Studies)

== Research vessels ==
SCMI operates a fleet of two research vessels, the 76-foot R/V Yellowfin and the 64-foot R/V Sea Watch.

== See also ==
- California State University
  - Moss Landing Marine Laboratories
- Marine Mammal Center
- Alliance for Coastal Technologies
