= Pacific Islands Ocean Observing System =

Organisation in US Integrated Ocean Observing System

The Pacific Islands Ocean Observing System (PacIOOS) is a nonprofit association and one of eleven such associations in the U.S. Integrated Ocean Observing System, funded in part by the National Oceanic and Atmospheric Administration (NOAA).

The PacIOOS area covers eight time zones, and 2300 individual islands associated with the U.S. Observation priorities are public safety, direct economic value, and environmental preservation. Among ocean characteristics reported are:

- Currents forecast
- Shoreline impacts such as high sea level
- Buoy water characteristics including salinity, turbidity, and temperature

The PacIOOS website is hosted by the University of Hawaii at Manoa, and provides interactive graphs and map viewers.
