= Integrated Ocean Observing System =

Automated system collecting oceanic data

The United States Integrated Ocean Observing System (U.S. IOOS) is a national-regional partnership of ocean observing systems that routinely and continuously provide quality-controlled data and observations of the oceans within the United States exclusive economic zone (EEZ) and Great Lakes. The U.S. Integrated Ocean Observing System program office is seated within the National Ocean Service of the National Oceanic and Atmospheric Administration. U.S. IOOS is a multidisciplinary system, consisting of eleven Regional Associations, that provide data in forms and at rates required by decision makers to address various societal needs, such as maritime safety, natural hazards, the blue economy, and human impacts on marine life. It is part of the UNESCO Intergovernmental Oceanographic Commission's Global Ocean Observing System efforts.

== Regional associations ==
The U.S. Integrated Ocean Observing System consists of eleven independent Regional Associations (RAs) that serve stakeholder needs within their respective regions. From a coastal perspective, the global ocean component is critical for providing data and information on basin scale forcings (e.g., ENSO events), as well as providing the data and information necessary to run coastal models (such as storm surge models).

- Alaska Ocean Observing System (AOOS)
- Central California Ocean Observing System (CeNCOOS)
- Great Lakes Observing System (GLOS)
- Northeastern Regional Association of Coastal Ocean Observing Systems (NERACOOS)
- Gulf of Mexico Coastal Ocean Observing System (GCOOS)
- Pacific Islands Ocean Observing System (PacIOOS)
- Mid-Atlantic Coastal Ocean Observing Regional Association (MACOORA)
- Northwest Association of Networked Ocean Observing Systems (NANOOS)
- Southern California Coastal Ocean Observing System (SCCOOS)
- Southeast Coastal Ocean Observing Regional Association (SECOORA)
- Caribbean Integrated Ocean Observing System (CarICOOS)

== See also ==
- GOOS
- Global Earth Observing System of Systems (GEOSS)
- Ocean acoustic tomography
- Argo (oceanography)
- Alliance for Coastal Technologies
- Omnibus Public Land Management Act of 2009 (authorizing legislation for IOOS)
