= Berenecea Eanes =

American social worker and academic administrator

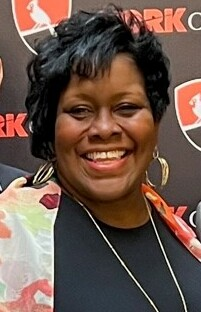
- Eanes in 2023

President of California State University, Los Angeles
- Incoming
- Assumed office January 8, 2024
- Preceded by: Leroy Morishita (interim)

President of York College, City University of New York
- In office June 1, 2020 – December 20, 2023
- Preceded by: self
- Succeeded by: Claudia V. Schrader (interim)
- Interim
- In office September 2, 2019 – May 31, 2020
- Preceded by: Marcia V. Keizs
- Succeeded by: self

Personal details
- Education: Dillard University; Boston University; Clark Atlanta University

Berenecea Johnson Eanes is an American social worker and academic administrator serving as the president of California State University, Los Angeles, since 2024. She previously served as the president of York College, City University of New York from 2019 until 2023.

== Life ==
Eanes earned a B.S. in public health from Dillard University in 1988. She completed a M.S.W. from Boston University in 1991. In 2000, she earned a Ph.D. in social work from Clark Atlanta University. Her dissertation was titled, An Analysis of Attitudes towards Marriage among African American Male College Students: A Test of Four Perspectives.

Eanes was vice president for student affairs at John Jay College of Criminal Justice from 2006 to 2012. From 2012 to 2019, she later served as the vice president for student affairs at California State University, Fullerton.

On September 2, 2019, Eanes was appointed interim president of York College, City University of New York. She was named president on June 1, 2020. Eanes stepped down in December 2023.

In September 2023, she was named the incoming president of California State University, Los Angeles. She assumes the role on January 8, 2024, succeeding interim Leroy Morishita. She is the first female president of the university.
