= Cal State LA Studios =

Coordinates: 34.068223°N 118.167389°W

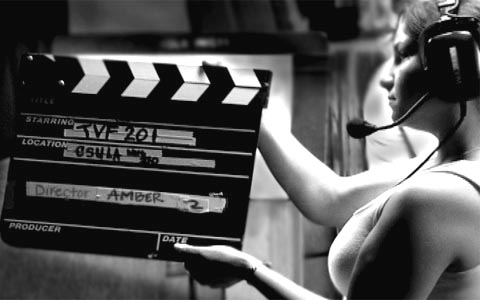
- Cal State LA Studios
- Company type: Academic Production Facility
- Industry: Film and Television Production, Media Studies
- Headquarters: California State University, Los Angeles, Los Angeles, United States
- Products: Television and Film Productions, Media Studies Programs
- Services: Academic and Professional Media Production
- Owner: California State University, Los Angeles
- Parent: California State University, Los Angeles
- Website: Official site

Cal State LA Studios is the production area of the Department of Television, Film, and Media Studies at California State University, Los Angeles, the only CSU campus in the Los Angeles basin. Bachelor of Arts degrees are offered in Telecommunications and Film, Broadcast Journalism and Animation. Master of Arts degree programs include Screenwriting and Critical Studies as well as a three option Master of Fine Arts (MFA) program in Dramatic Writing, Production/Direction, and Performance in Television, Film, & Theatre Arts. Production facilities and equipment include: 3-camera digital television studios, dedicated news studio, nonlinear postproduction workstations, postproduction labs and individual editing suites, 16 mm motion picture camera kits, DV and HDV camera kits, field lighting kits, and misc. grip equipment. In 2014, the department open the Television, Film and Media Studies Center with a new sound stage and audio post-production facilities.
