= USC Wrigley Institute for Environmental Studies =

Research and education facility in Southern California

Coordinates: 33.444686°N 118.482383°W

Wrigley Institute for Environment and Sustainability
- USC Wrigley Marine Science Center on Santa Catalina Island USC logo
- Other name: Philip K. Wrigley Marine Science Center
- Parent institution: USC
- Founder: USC
- Established: 1965; 61 years ago
- Mission: To develop programs in environmental and sustainability
- Website: dornsife.usc.edu/wrigley

The USC Wrigley Institute for Environment and Sustainability is an environmental research and education academic unit within the University of Southern California. It encompasses a wide range of faculty and topics across the university as well as operating a marine laboratory at the edge of Two Harbors, California on Catalina Island approximately 22 miles (35 km) south-southwest of Los Angeles.

The USC Wrigley Institute has specialized programs in environmental and sustainability topics across the natural sciences, social sciences, and humanities. The Institute also grants academic degrees through the USC Dornsife Environmental Studies Program and is home to the USC Sea Grant Program, part of the National Sea Grant Program through the National Oceanic and Atmospheric Administration.

== History ==
USC established the "Philip K. Wrigley Marine Science Center" on Catalina Island at Big Fisherman Cove following a grant of more than 14 acres of land from the families of Philip K. Wrigley and Paxson Offield in 1965. In 1995, William and Julie Wrigley continued their family legacy by providing USC with the capital to initiate the Wrigley Institute for Environmental Studies. Their gift provided for an endowed faculty chair and the renovation of the Wrigley Marine Science Center. The institute was renamed to the Wrigley Institute for Environment and Sustainability in 2023, to reflect the expansion of its research and academic activities. Today, the USC research complex on Catalina Island is the centerpiece of the Wrigley Institute, with additional staff and offices on the University of Southern California's University Park Campus in downtown Los Angeles.

== Current leadership and initiatives ==
The Wrigley Institute of Environmental Studies is currently led by Director Joe Árvai, the first social scientist to lead the institute. Árvai’s research focuses on the psychology of decision-making around the environment and sustainability, including how companies and governments make decisions and how people deal with climate misinformation and incorporate their values into their environmental choices.

The institute also has a senior leadership team consisting of an executive director, three directors (of the Wrigley Marine Science Center, Environmental Studies Program, and USC Sea Grant), and three associate directors (of WMSC operations, business strategy and finance, and public communications).

Under Árvai’s leadership, the Wrigley Institute has expanded from a focus on marine science, chemistry, and Earth sciences to also studying environmental and sustainability issues in economics, psychology, sociology, English, history, and a variety of other fields. The institute has major initiatives to fund USC faculty research, internships for undergraduate students, and public events.

== Past leadership ==
Since the founding of the Wrigley Institute in 1995, past leadership has included:

- Dr. Anthony "Tony" Michaels
- Dr. Donal Monahan
- Dr. Roberta Marinelli
- Dr. Ken Nealson

The Wrigley Institute manages the USC Wrigley Marine Science Center, which is located near Two Harbors on Catalina Island, and borders the Blue Cavern State Marine Conservation Area.

USC provides boat transportation several times per week for the USC community to the Catalina facility from the Southern California Marine Institute on Terminal Island.

== USC Wrigley Sustainability Prize ==
Between 2017 and 2023, the institute hosted a pitch competition for sustainable businesses called the USC Wrigley Sustainability Prize. The event highlighted innovative start-up ideas from all disciplines and rewarded concepts that could result in meaningful environmental change. Winning teams received prize money to help translate their ideas into action. Winners included:

- Catapower – creates renewable biofuel and plastic from vegetable oil and won the 2018 prize
- Apeiron – creates graphene by retrofitting power plants
- Interphase – increases energy efficiency for power plants
- Closed Composites - recycles the carbon fiber from airplanes and won the 2019 prize

== Catalina Hyperbaric Chamber ==
Based at the USC Wrigley Marine Science Center, the USC Catalina Hyperbaric Chamber is an emergency medical facility on Catalina Island for the treatment of scuba diving accidents. The chamber facilities are on the waterfront of the Wrigley Marine Science Center and adjacent to a helipad that is licensed for day or night helicopter landings. The chamber itself is large enough to treat several patients at once and provides enough room for staff and volunteers to perform cardiopulmonary resuscitation (CPR) and advanced life support for patients who arrive in cardiac arrest.

The Catalina Chamber Crew works closely with the Los Angeles County Medical Alert Center (MAC) and operates as an extension of the Los Angeles County-USC Medical Center Department of Emergency Medicine. The chamber is managed by a fulltime member of the USC Wrigley Marine Science Center, and it is staffed all day, every day, by a rotating team of trained volunteers. Financial support comes from Los Angeles County; from donations by individual contributors, dive clubs and dive boat operators, and from special fund raising events.

== Wrigley Advisory Board members ==
The advisory board has 19 members, including Wrigley family members.

- Philip Hagenah - (Advisory Board Co-chair), Founder, Film House, Inc.
- Todd Bauer - (Advisory Board Co-chair), Founder and President, Guardian Group, Inc.
- Alison Wrigley Rusack - Executive Chairman, Santa Catalina Island Company; Co-owner, Rusack Vineyards
- Terry Adams - Director, SA Recycling
- Sevag Ajemian - President and CEO, Kinetix Air AHU Software
- Anjini Desai - Founder and CEO, DeChai Tea; Admissions Director, Roots and Wings Center TK
- Brock Dewey - Executive Vice President, Dewey Pest Control
- Rod Diefendorf - President and Chief Operating Officer, PitchBook
- Alexandra Jameson - Managing Partner, Jameson GDP
- Sam King - Chairman of the Board and CEO, King’s Seafood Company
- Calen Offield - President, CBO Investment LLC; Co-director, Offield Center for Billfish Studies/Catalina Sea Bass Fund
- Chase Offield - CEO, Offield Center for Billfish Studies; Director, Catalina Sea Bass Fund
- Maria Pellegrini - Executive Director for Programs, W.M. Keck Foundation
- John Rego - Senior Vice President for Sustainability, Sony Pictures, and Environmental Officer, Sony Group
- Diane Sonosky Montgomery - Vice President of Administration, Innovative Solutions Insurance Services (ret.)
- David Thomas - Owner/Principal, FoodSci Advisory LLC; Chief Research & Development Officer, Keurig Dr Pepper (ret.)
- Denise Verret - CEO and Zoo Director, Los Angeles Zoo and Botanical Gardens
- Julie Wrigley - President and CEO, Wrigley Investments LLC; President, Julie A. Wrigley Foundation; Manager, GlenNeva Landholdings
- Daniel Zinsmeyer - Co-creator, Zinsmeyer Family Endowed Undergraduate Research Fund
