= Alliance for Coastal Technologies =

Established in 2000, the Alliance for Coastal Technologies (ACT) is a NOAA-funded partnership of research institutions, resource managers, and private sector companies dedicated to fostering the development and adoption of effective and reliable sensors and platforms.

== Mission ==
ACT is committed to providing the information required to select the most appropriate tools for studying and monitoring coastal environments. Priorities include transitioning emerging technologies to operational use, rapidly and effectively; maintaining a dialogue among technology users, developers, and providers; identifying technology needs and novel technologies; documenting technology performance and potential and providing the Integrated Ocean Observing System (IOOS) with information required for the deployment of reliable and cost-effective networks.

== Services ==
- Third-party testbed for quantitatively evaluating the performance of new and existing coastal technologies in the laboratory and under diverse environmental conditions. Instrument performance demonstrations and verifications are necessary so that effective existing technologies can be recognized and so that promising new technologies can become available to support coastal science, resource management, and ocean observing systems. To this end, ACT serves as an unbiased, third party testbed for evaluating sensors and sensor platforms for use in coastal environments.
- ACT conducts two types of Technology Evaluations. Technology Verifications are evaluations of commercially available instruments to verify manufacturers’ performance specifications or claims, which must be carried out at five or more (but typically at all) Partner sites. Technology Demonstrations are a less rigorous exercise where the abilities and potential of a new technology is established by working closely with developers/manufacturers to field test instruments in diverse coastal waters. Although all partner Institutions are involved in Demonstrations, the field tests are typically conducted at only two or three sites. The results of these evaluations are released to the public as either Verification or Demonstration Statements.
- Capacity building through technology specific workshops that review the current state of instrumentation, build consensus on future directions, and enhance communications between users and developers. ACT workshops are designed to aid resource managers, coastal scientists, and private sector companies by identifying and discussing the current status, standardization, potential advancements, and obstacles in the development and use of sensors and sensor platforms for studying, monitoring, and predicting the state of coastal waters. The workshop goals are to both help build consensus on the steps needed to develop useful tools while also facilitating the critical communications between the various groups of technology developers, manufacturers, and users.
- Information clearinghouse through a searchable online database of environmental technologies and community discussion boards. This is a living database that is continuously updated and allows the user to identify technologies available to meet their needs. One can search by environmental parameters, sensor type, or manufacturer.

== Organization ==
Headquarters for ACT is located at the UMCES Chesapeake Biological Laboratory and is staffed by the personnel listed below. ACT Headquarters coordinates all activities and oversees the technology evaluations, website, technology database, and information transfer. Headquarters staff also coordinate with other programs such as NOAA, U.S. Environmental Protection Agency, Ocean.US, NSF, and CICEET.

The ACT Board of Directors is the formal program governing body. They establish program foci, provide program vision, and foster links with the broader community. The ACT Board of Directors consists of the Lead Principal Investigator, the Co-Chairs of the Stakeholders Council, and the Principal Investigators of all ACT Partner Institutions (listed below) as voting members. Ex officio, non-voting members of the Board include representatives from NOAA Coastal Services Center and the ACT Executive Director.

The Stakeholders Council was created to foster the interactive flow of information and ideas among the various user groups and disciplines critical to the success of ACT. Up to 21 Council members are recruited from private sector companies, environmental management agencies, and NGOs representing geographic and sector diversity. The Council members participate actively as representatives of the greater coastal community in planning and decision making to help ensure that ACT focuses on service-oriented activities.

There are currently eight ACT Partner institutions around the country with coastal technology expertise that represent a broad range of environmental conditions for testing. The Partner institutions help identify technologies to be evaluated and themes for workshops. They are also responsible for defining and conducting regional outreach activities and serve as information conduits to the broader coastal science and management communities. The following represent the eight ACT Partners:

- Alaska SeaLife Center (UA/ASLC)
- Gulf of Maine Ocean Observing System (GoMOOS)
- Moss Landing Marine Laboratories (MLML/MBARI)
- Skidaway Institute of Oceanography (SkIO)
- UMCES Chesapeake Biological Laboratory (CBL) and ACT Headquarters Location
- University of South Florida (USF)
- School of Ocean & Earth Science & Technology (SOEST)
- Cooperative Institute for Limnology & Ecosystems Research (CILER)
