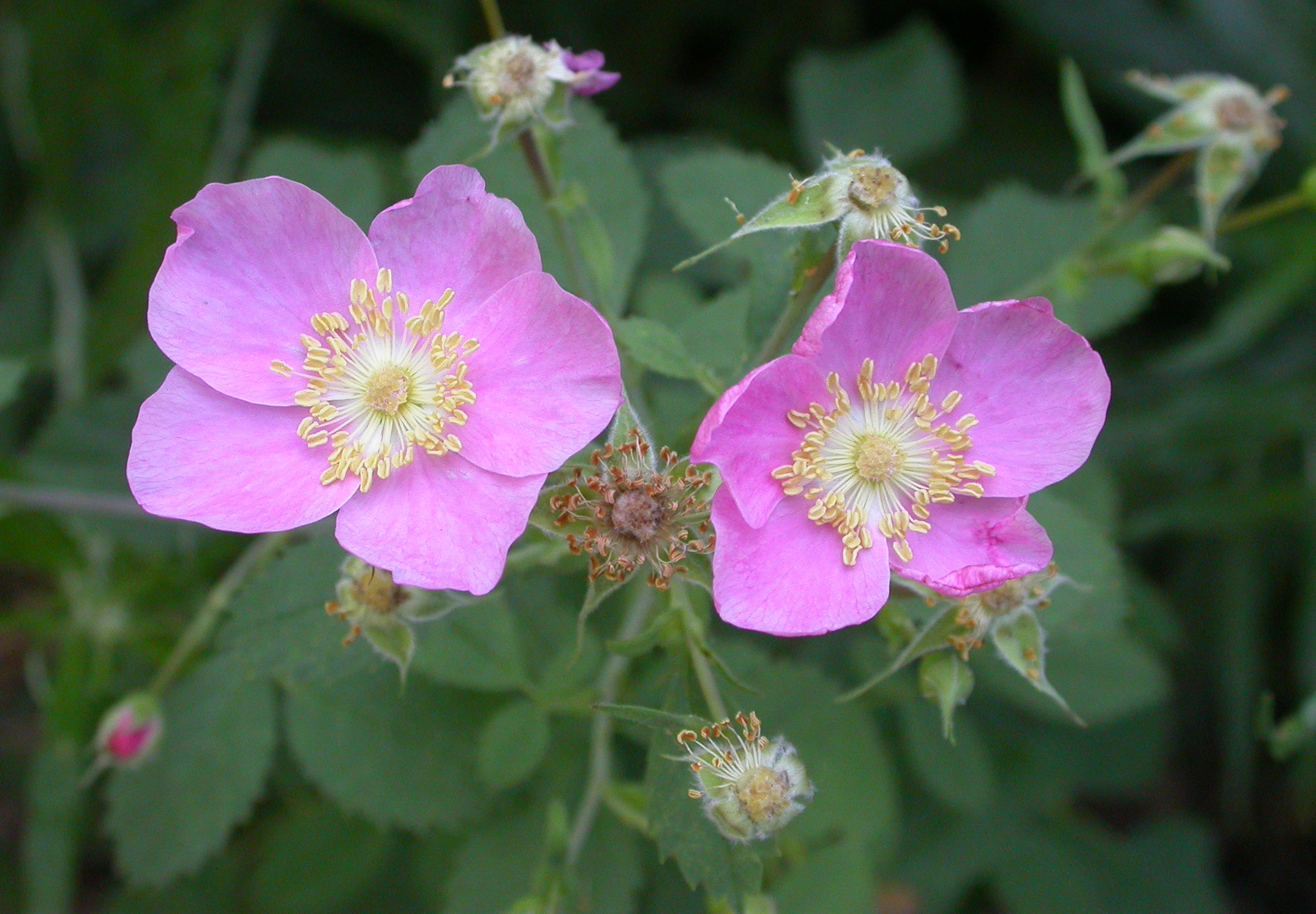

Scientific classification
- Kingdom: Plantae
- Clade: Tracheophytes
- Clade: Angiosperms
- Clade: Eudicots
- Clade: Rosids
- Order: Rosales
- Family: Rosaceae
- Genus: Rosa
- Species: R. californica

Binomial name
- Rosa californica Cham. & Schldl.

= Rosa californica =

California wildrose

Species of plant

Rosa californica, the California wildrose, or California rose, is a species of rose native to the U.S. states of California and Oregon and the northern part of Baja California, Mexico. The plant is native to chaparral and woodlands and the Sierra Nevada foothills, and can survive drought, though it grows most abundantly in moist soils near water sources.

This thorny, flowering, fruit-bearing shrub is also deciduous, and grows vertically up to six feet tall.

== Description ==
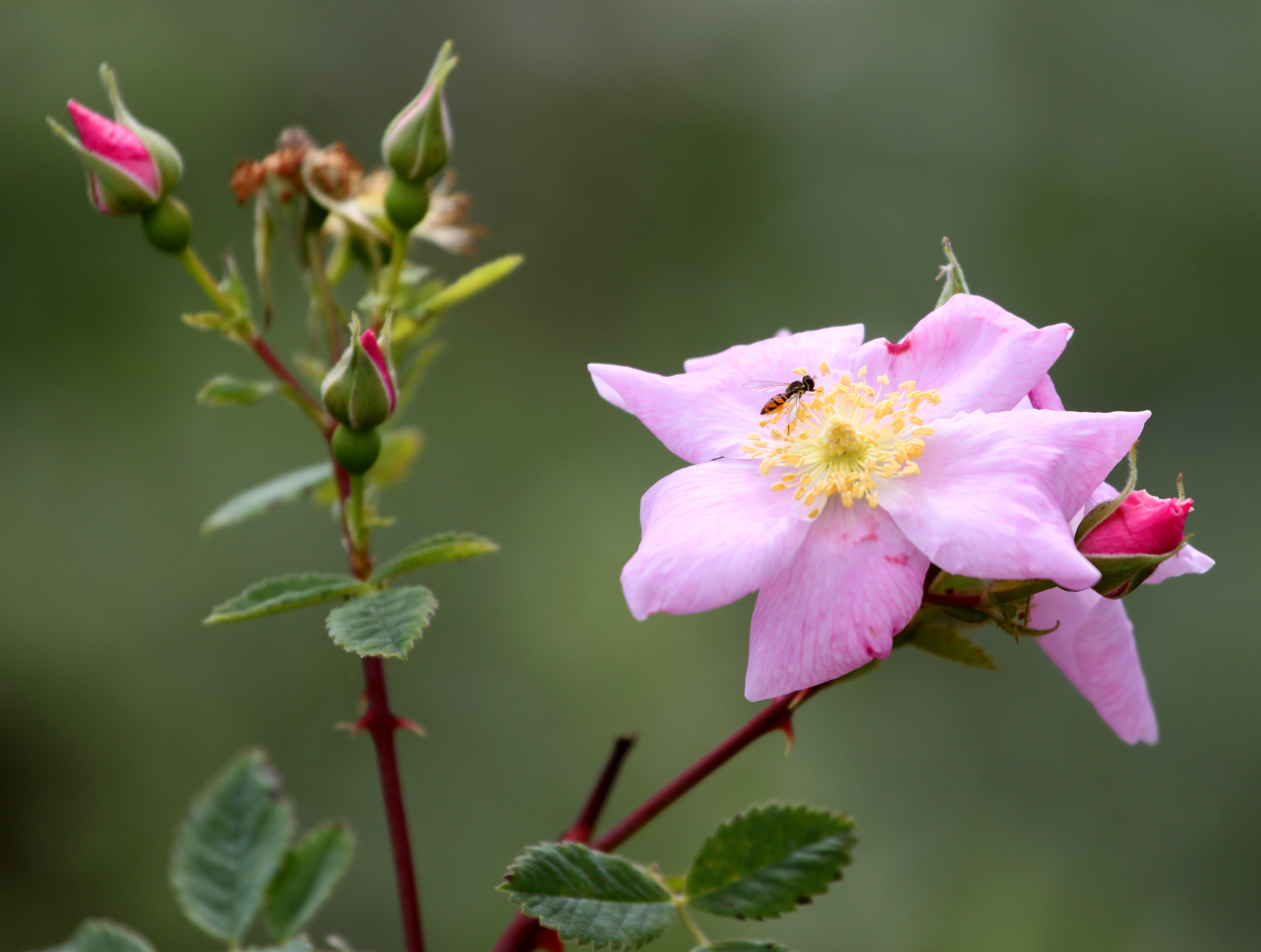

Rosa californica is a bush or thicket-forming shrub with prickly, curving stems. The fragrant flowers may grow singly or in inflorescences of several blooms. Each rose is open-faced and generally flat, with five petals in any shade of pink from almost white to deep magenta. The five smooth petals and sepals have a bowl-like bloom, semi-inferior ovaries, and compound veiny and hairy leaves. R. californica also bears fruit called "rose hips," which contain yellow seeds.

== Distribution, habitat, and adaptations ==
Rosa californica is a common plant native to California. It is primarily found in elevations of below 6,000 feet. While most common in moist regions like river banks, the plant can also adapt to various soil textures, develop drought resistance, and has common-pest and disease resistance.

== Competition ==
Rosa californica competes with other vegetation in moist environments because of its lateral spreading rhizomes (horizontally-spreading underground roots) and above-ground, thorny stems. Moreover, the wildroses' stems and shoots can be cut, but will regrow from submerged rhizomes. Thus, R. californica may develop thickets and overwhelm "desirable vegetation" under improper management. However, it does not pose a foreseeable environmental concern.

== Cultivation ==
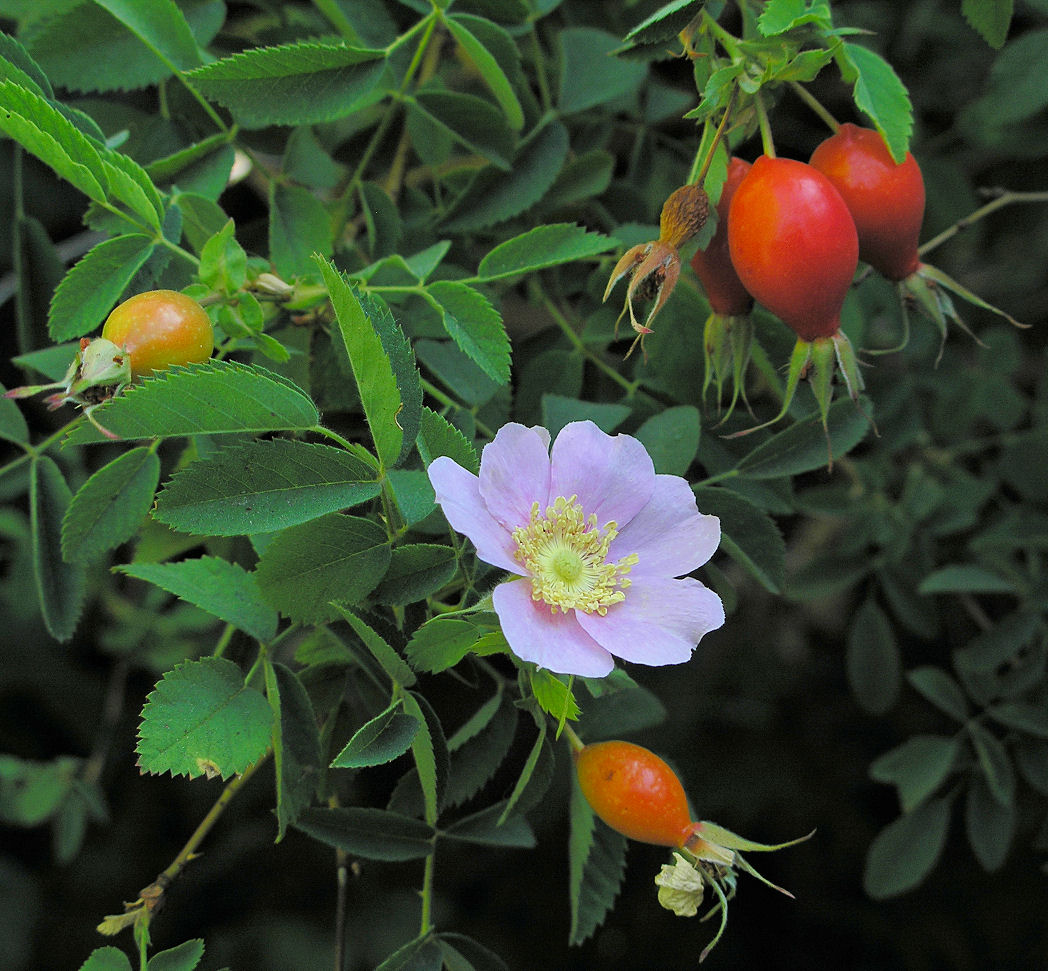

Rosa californica is used in California native gardens and habitat gardens, forming colonies, and attracting wildlife with the bright rose hips in autumn. Hard, dry internal seeds can be extracted by hand from mature, bright red hips. The wildrose can also be propagated with stem or rhizome cuttings.

== Uses ==
Rosa californica is readily acclimated. Its natural propagation helps restore damp areas. Subterranean stems stabilize the surrounding earth. Thorny thickets offer ground cover, shelter, and even nests for organisms.

R. californica's open flowers and nectar attract insects and pollinators. Its lengthened spring to fall blooming period offers food for local bees. R. californica's fruits also persist on thickets through the forage-scarce winter, serving as food for bugs, birds, and hoofed mammals like deer and elk.

The wildroses' hips are related to the Rosaceae family's apricots, apples, and roses. They are fragrant, edible, and look and taste like "small apples." Some indigenous California tribes eat R. californica's hips raw and use the stems and fibers for crafts like coiled baskets, jewelry, and decoration. Other tribes leverage the roses' medicinal properties. They used a mix of rose petals, leaves, and/or rose "hips" in drinks or as medicine to relieve skin and general inflammation, pain, and illness (including fever, stomach pains, and sores).

The rose hips were used during World War II for their high vitamin content. They are dried for tea, or for use in jellies and sauces. The Cahuilla eat the rose buds raw or soaked them in water for drinking. A tea was also made from the roots, and used for colds. Because the rose hips remain on the plant throughout the winter, they provide food for wildlife during times when little forage is available.

== See also ==
- California chaparral and woodlands - (ecoregion)
- California montane chaparral and woodlands - (sub-ecoregion)
- California interior chaparral and woodlands - (sub-ecoregion)
