= Solar Eagle =

Solar Eagle may refer to:

- Boeing SolarEagle, a solar/electric-powered unmanned aerial vehicle
- Solar Eagle, a series of solar cars developed by the Cal State LA Solar Car Team
