= Cal State LA Solar Car Team =

The Cal State LA Solar Car Team was a group of engineering students at California State University, Los Angeles that developed the Solar Eagle series of solar cars that competed in solar car races in the United States and Australia.

== Solar Eagle ==
Solar Eagle
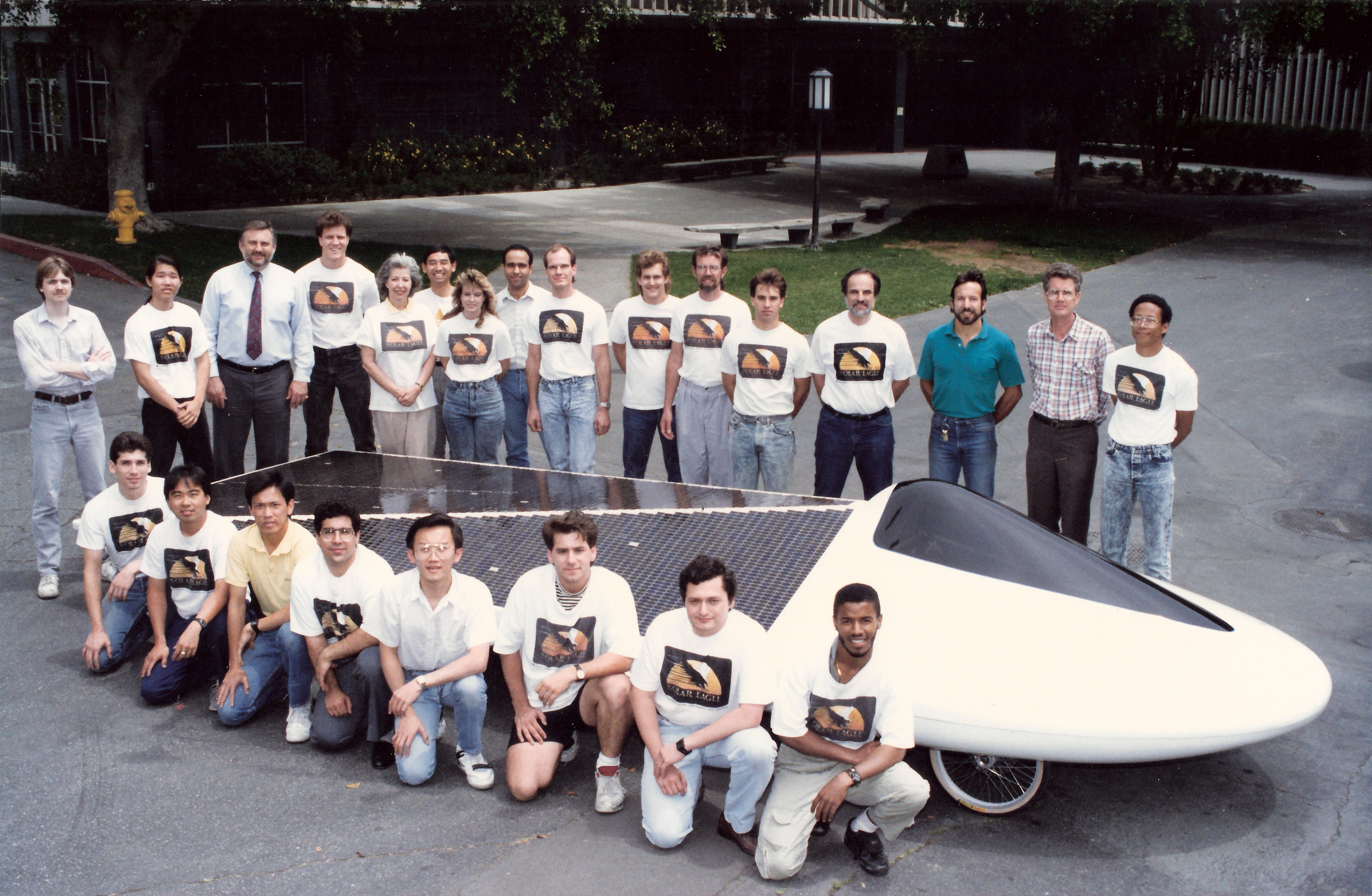
- Cal State LA

Technical specifications
- Chassis: Aluminum T6061 tubing frame, carbon/glass/Nomex sandwich body
- Suspension: Non-parallel double A-arm suspension with coil over shocks, both front and rear
- Length: 6.030 m (19.78 ft)
- Width: 2.017 m (6.62 ft)
- Height: 1.100 m (3.61 ft)
- Wheelbase: 2.743 m (108.0 in)
- Electric motor: Unique Mobility, Inc. DC brushless
- Transmission: Direct Kevlar cog belt-driven rear wheel
- Battery: Eagle-Picher, Silver-Zinc, 80 cells, 3.0 kWh, 33 kg, 120 Volts
- Power: Solar panels: 800 W (1.1 hp) peak
- Weight: 205 kg (452 lb) (without driver)
- Brakes: Hydraulic disk brakes front regenerative brakes on drive
- Tires: 20x1.75 inch Avocet slicks, 85 psi Tire rolling resistance: 0.0067

Competition history
- Competition: GM Sunrayce USA 1990 (4th place); World Solar Challenge 1990 (top 10)

- 1990: Solar Eagle - GM Sunrayce USA: 4th place
- 1990: Solar Eagle - World Solar Challenge: in the top ten
- On display at Cal State LA

The Solar Eagle was designed and built by the Cal State L.A. School of Engineering & Technology students, faculty and staff. In July 1990, the Solar Eagle placed fourth in the 1,643 mile GM Sunrayce, the best performance among California entrants, and ahead of 28 other colleges and universities including MIT and Stanford. In the daily races, it placed first twice, second once, and third place three times, and the Solar Eagle was the only car in the race that had no mechanical or electrical failures during the race.

=== World Solar Challenge ===
The Solar Eagle placed in the top ten out of 40 cars from 9 countries (13 Australia, 11 Japan, 9 United States) during the 1990 World Solar Challenge in Australia. The race took place on November 11, 1990 starting from Darwin and ending in Adelaide, Australia, covering 1,900 miles (3,100 km).

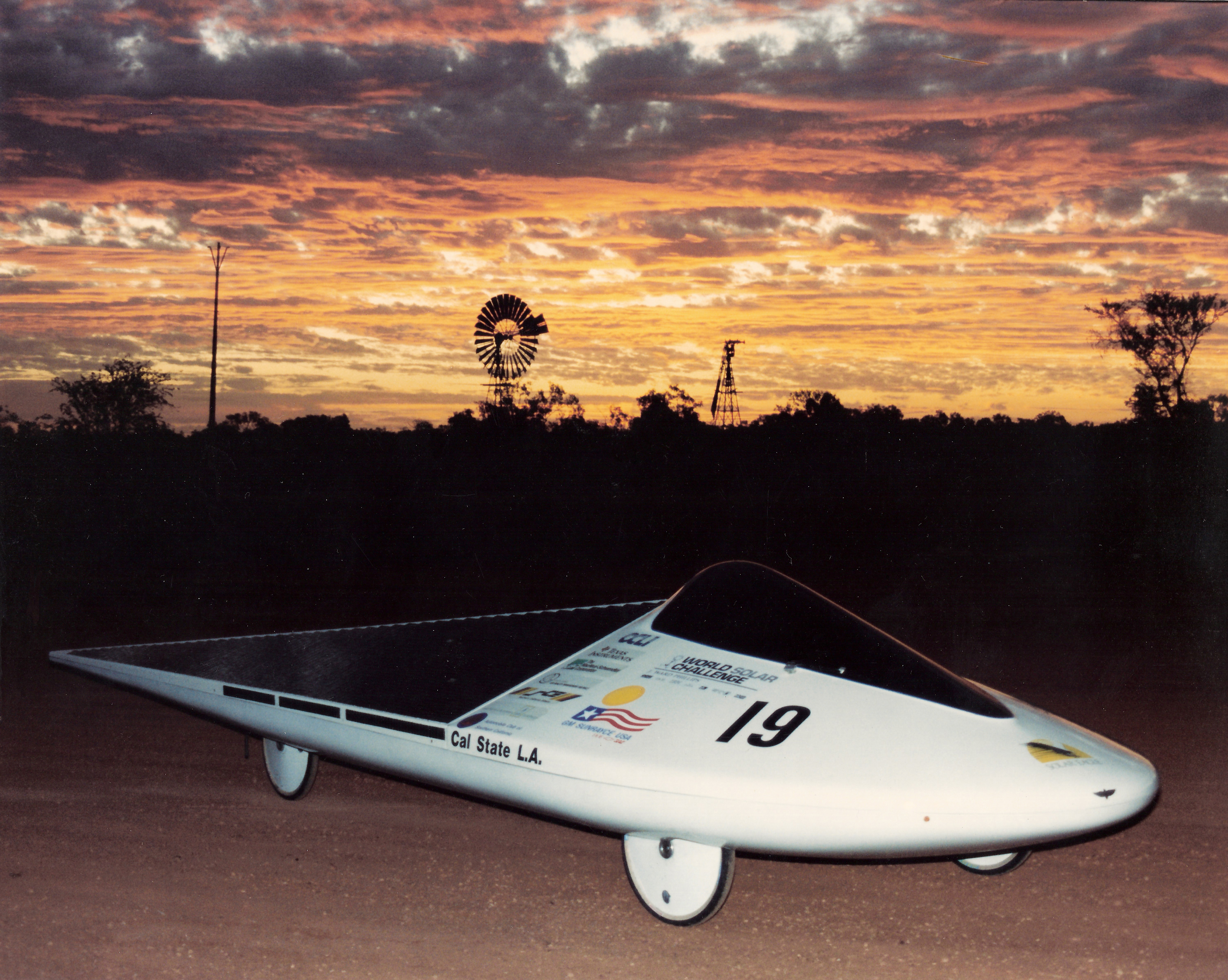
World Solar Challenge
Australia

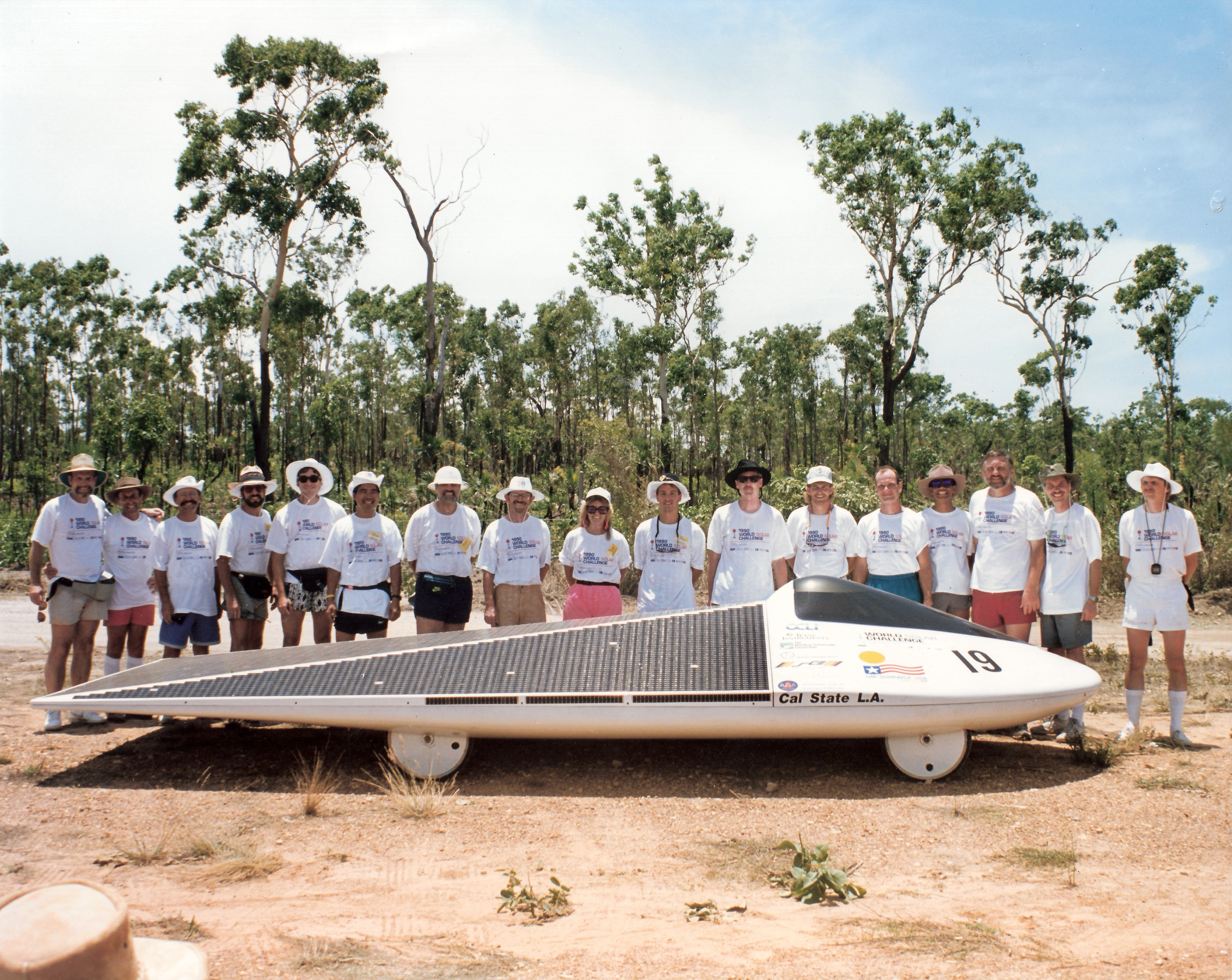
World Solar Challenge
Darwin Australia

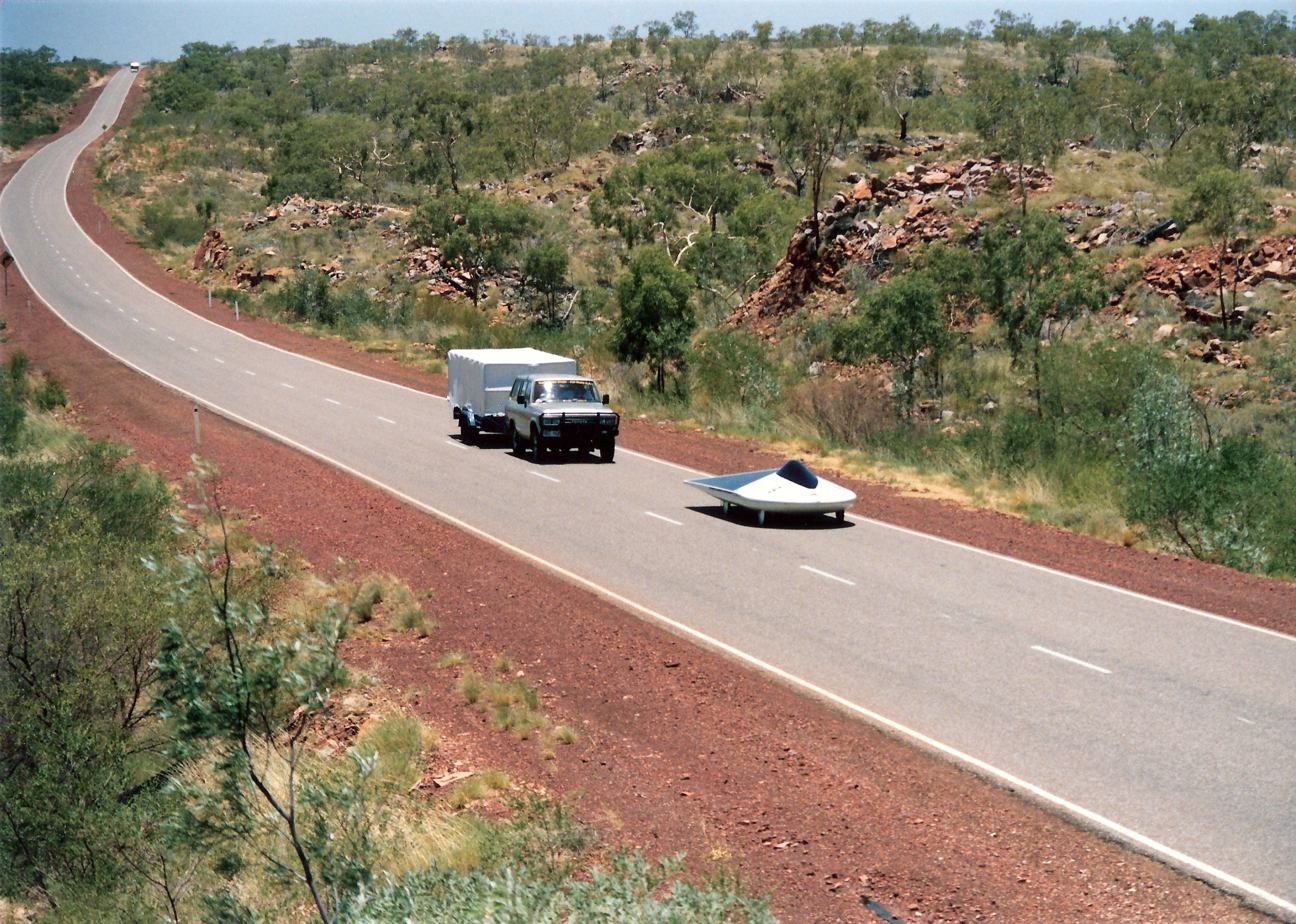
World Solar Challenge
Australia

=== Technical specifications ===
- Length: 6 meters
- Width: 2 meters
- Height: 1 meter
- Weight: 459 pounds (without driver)
- Drag Coefficient: 0.123
- Frame: Welded 6061 T6 aluminum alloy tubing (Weight=23 pounds)
- Body: Carbon fiber/NOMEX composite sandwich
- Solar panel: Fiberglass/NOMEX composite sandwich
- Solar cells: 8,945 Spectrolab K7 single-crystal silicon space quality cells
- Motor: Unique Mobility, Inc. DC brushless motor
- Batteries: Eagle-Picher silver-zinc batteries; 120 volt nominal buss voltage; 4 kW-hr total capacity at C20 rate

=== Awards ===
The car also won three Department of Energy Awards: first place for "Best Artistic Design" ($500), second place for "Innovation in Power Train Design" ($800), and third place for "Teamwork" ($600).

Other honors include:

- Society of Automotive Engineers: fifth place for "Engineering Design and Safety"
- Engineering Excellence Award: Unique Mobility, Inc.
- The Governor's Energy Award: State of Florida
- Team Honored by Los Angeles City Council, August 10, 1990
- Nationally televised appearance on Into the Night, Starring Rick Dees, August 15, 1990
- Team Honored by Department of Water and Power Board of Commissioners, August 23, 1990
- City of Los Angeles, Mayor Tom Bradley: Commendation
- Board of Directors, City of Pasadena: Commendation
- City of Alhambra, Mayor Barbara Messina: Commendation
- City of Monterey Park, Mayor Judy Chu: Commendation
- U.S. Senator Pete Wilson: Commendation
- U.S. Congressman Matthew G. Martinez: Congressional Award

== Solar Eagle II ==
Solar Eagle II
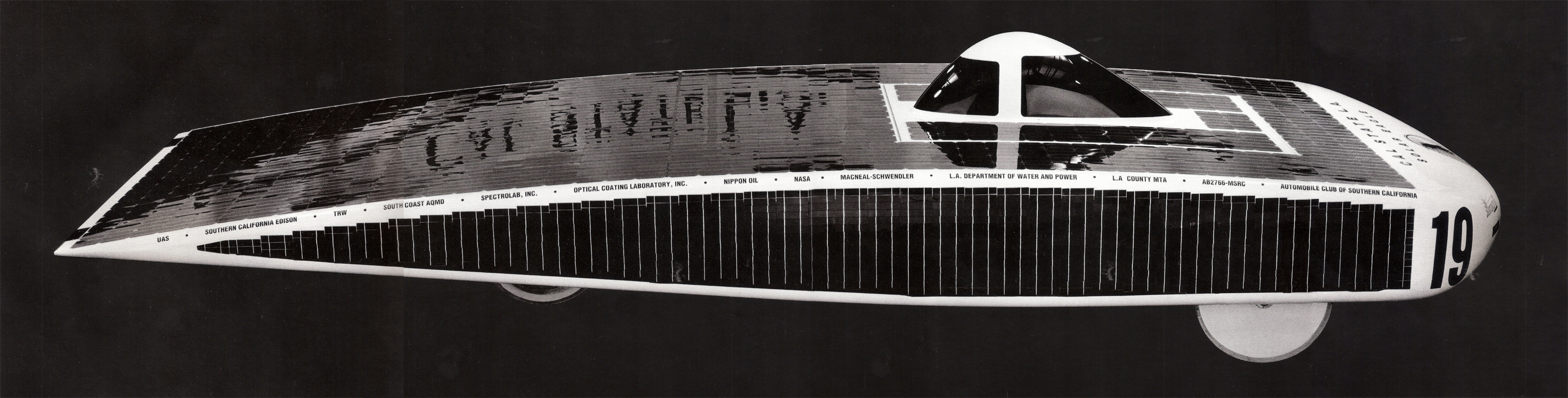
- GM Sunrayce USA

Technical specifications
- Chassis: Welded aluminum space frame with carbon fiber composite battery box and underneath pan to provide shear and torsional strength, carbon fiber skin with Rohacell structural foam core body
- Length: 4.9 m (16 ft)
- Width: 1.9 m (6.1 ft)
- Height: 1.0 m (3.3 ft)
- Electric motor: Solectria DC brushless motor and controller
- Battery: 10x 12-volt U.S. Battery Mfg. Co. lead acid batteries
- Power: Solar panels: 0.960 kW (1.287 hp); Motor: 4.8 kW (6.5 hp) at 5500 rpm
- Weight: 160 kg (360 lb) (without driver and batteries)

Competition history
- Competition: GM Sunrayce USA 1993 (3rd place); World Solar Challenge 1993 (13th place)

- 1993: Solar Eagle II - GM Sunrayce USA: 3rd place
- 1993: Solar Eagle II - World Solar Challenge: 13th place
- On display at the California Science Center in Los Angeles

In June 1993, the Solar Eagle II placed third in the 1000 mile Sunrayce 93 — a cross-country race from Dallas, Texas to Minneapolis, Minnesota. The Solar Eagle II started the race in the pole position having qualified with the fastest time. Solar Eagle II finished ahead of 33 other universities including such Stanford, George Washington University and UC Berkeley. The car and team were honored with a second place award in Technical Innovation for Chassis Design, Propulsion and Aerodynamic Systems by the Sunrayce 93 judges and they received a third place award from the Society of Automotive Engineers (SAE) for Design Excellence in Engineering Safety. In November 1993, the Solar Eagle II gained international recognition by placing thirteenth out of a fifty-four car field, and became the fourth U.S. team to cross the finish line at the 1993 World Solar Challenge, a grueling 1,882 mile race across the Australian outback.

Cal State L.A. was selected as one of 30 universities granted entry in the Sunrayce 95 competition as well, for which the Solar Eagle II was revamped.

The car has a top speed of 62 mph (100 km/h) and can travel up to 300 miles (480 km) on a sunny day.

=== Technical specifications ===
- Length: 16 feet
- Width: 6.1 feet
- Height: 3.3 feet
- Weight: 360 pounds (without driver and batteries)
- Structure: Welded aluminum space frame with carbon fiber composite battery box and underneath pan to provide shear and torsional strength.
- Body: Carbon fiber skin with Rohacell structural foam core
- Solar power system: 754 single crystal BP Saturn cells (3.7" x 3/8") on top; 824 quarter-size cut cells on vehicle sides, cerium-doped and antireflective
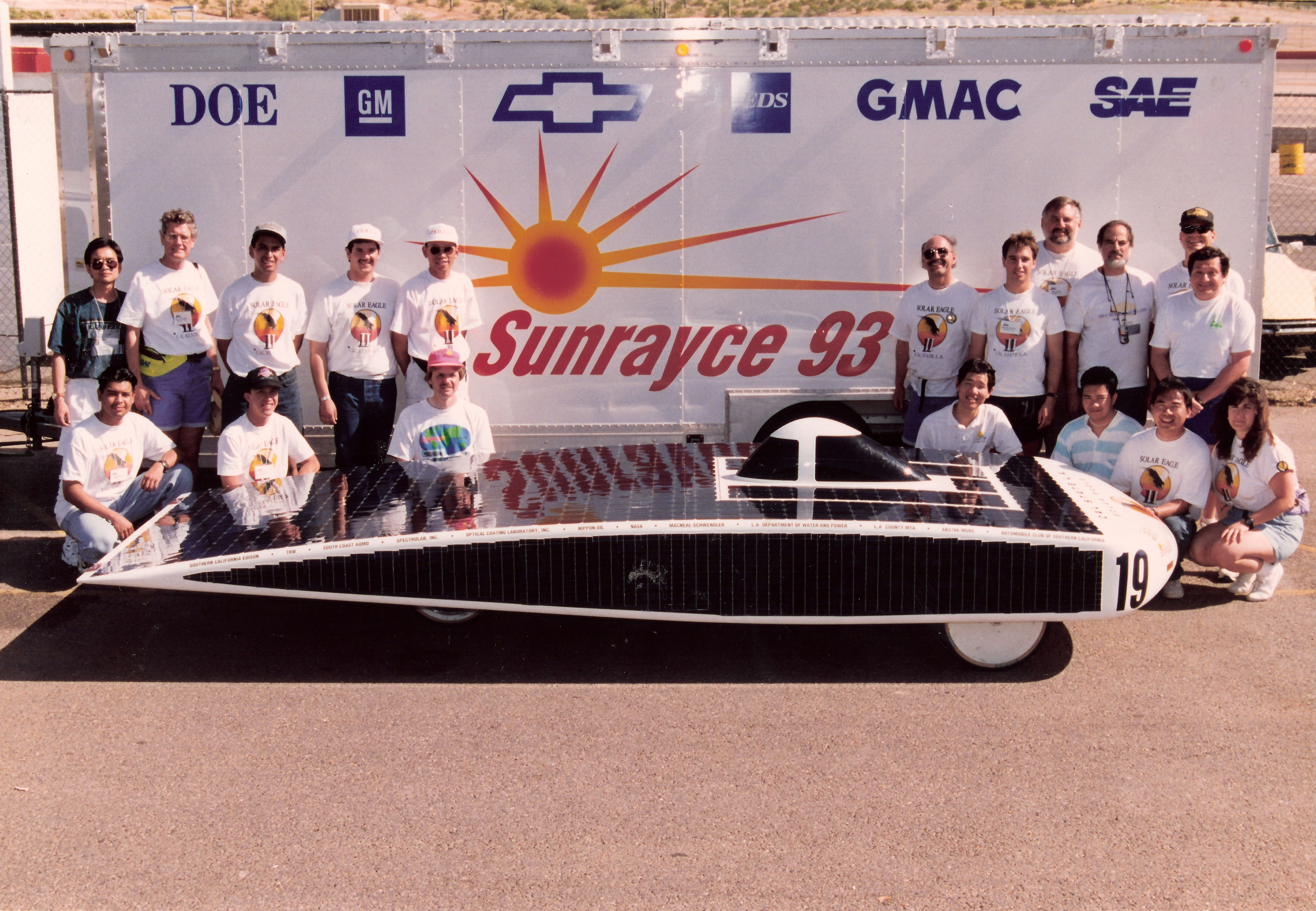
GM Sunrayce USA

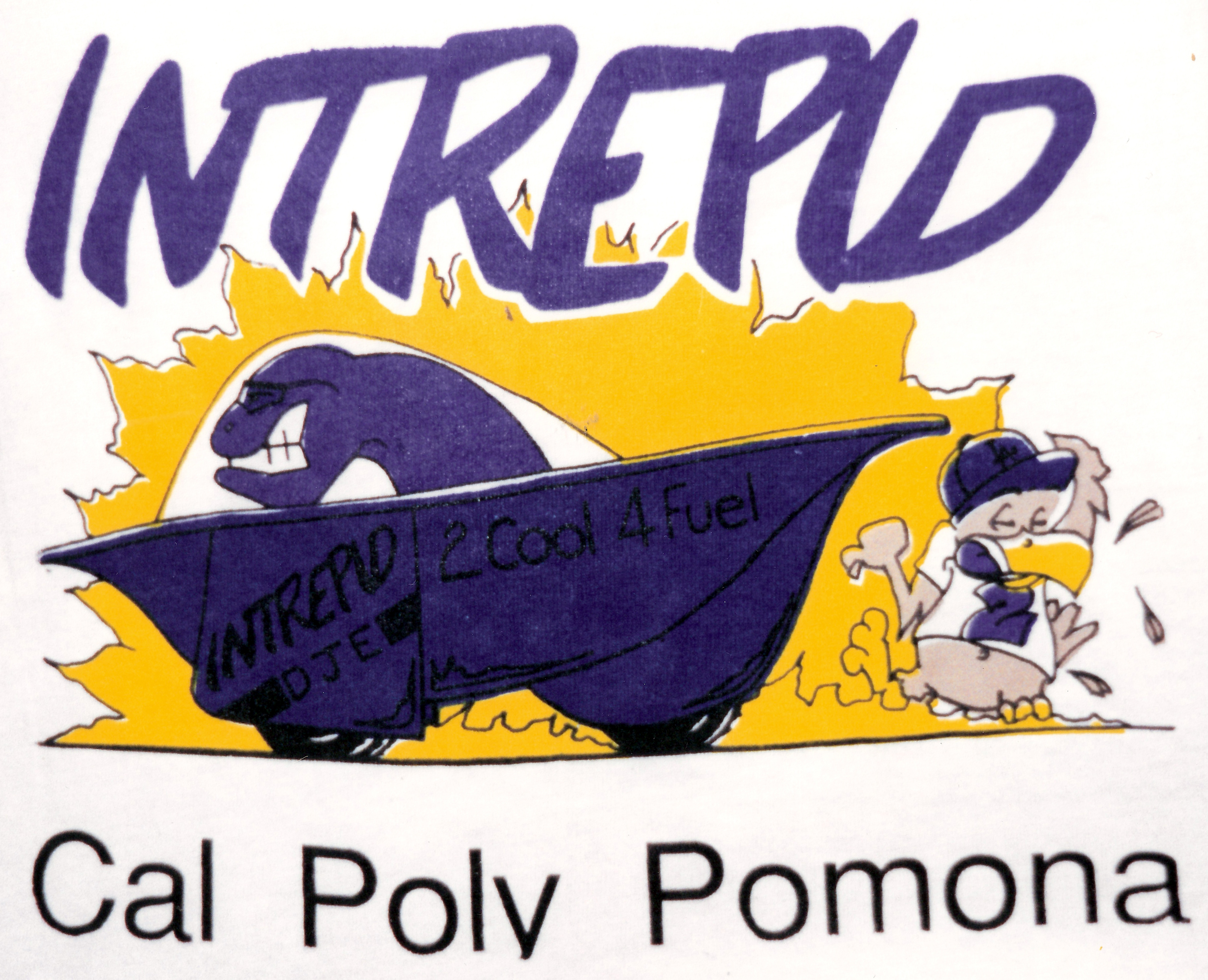
GM Sunrayce USA

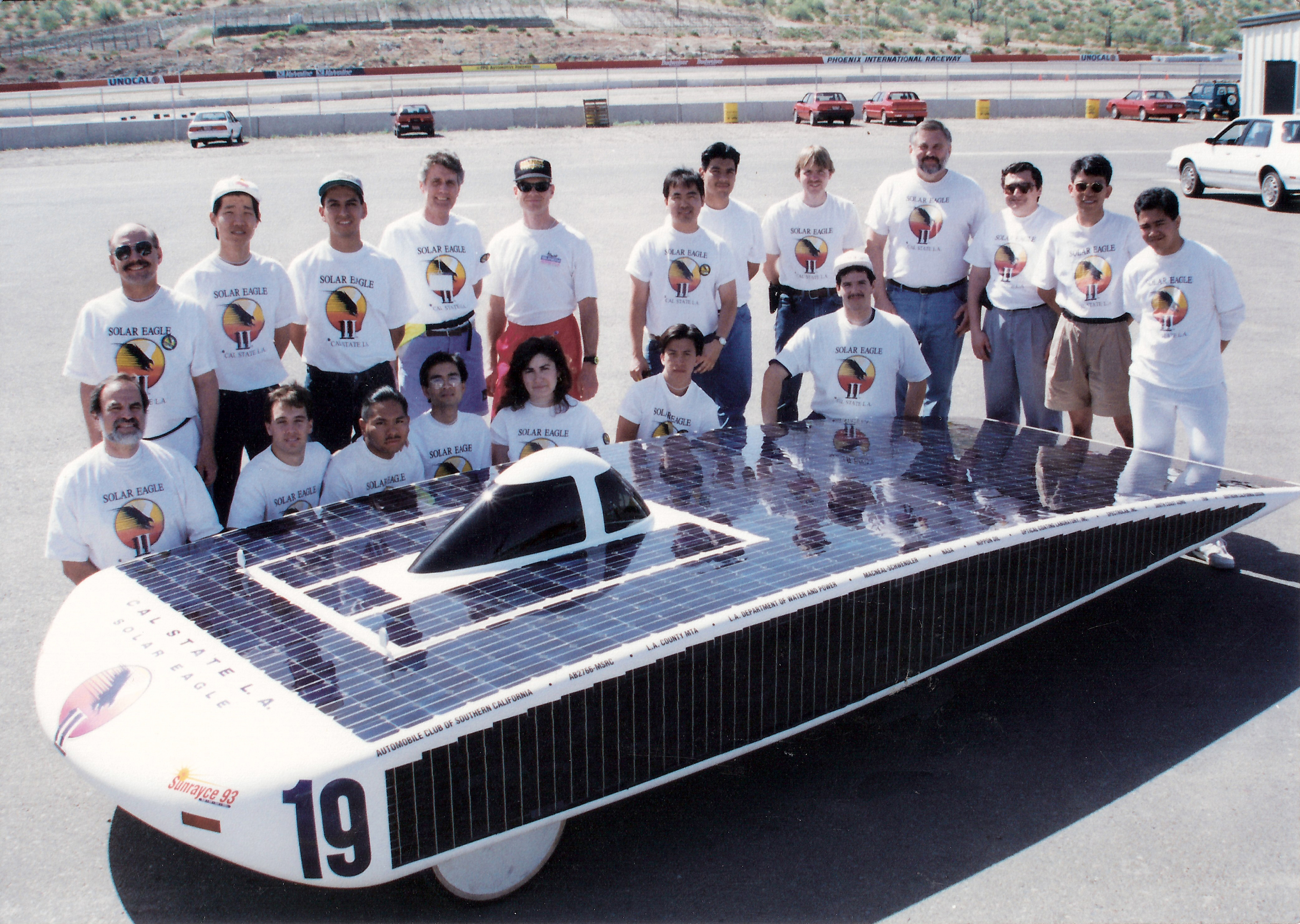
GM Sunrayce USA

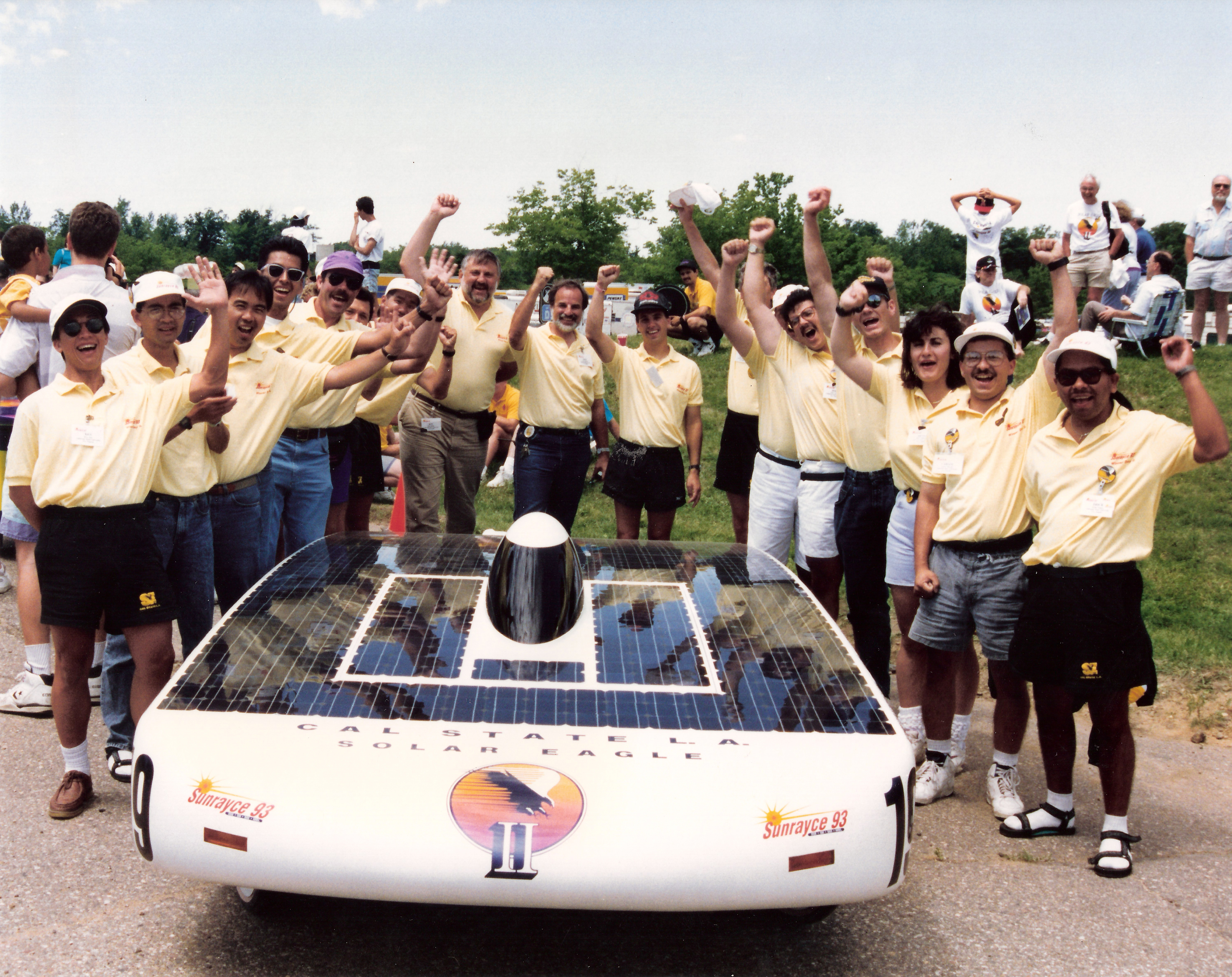
GM Sunrayce USA

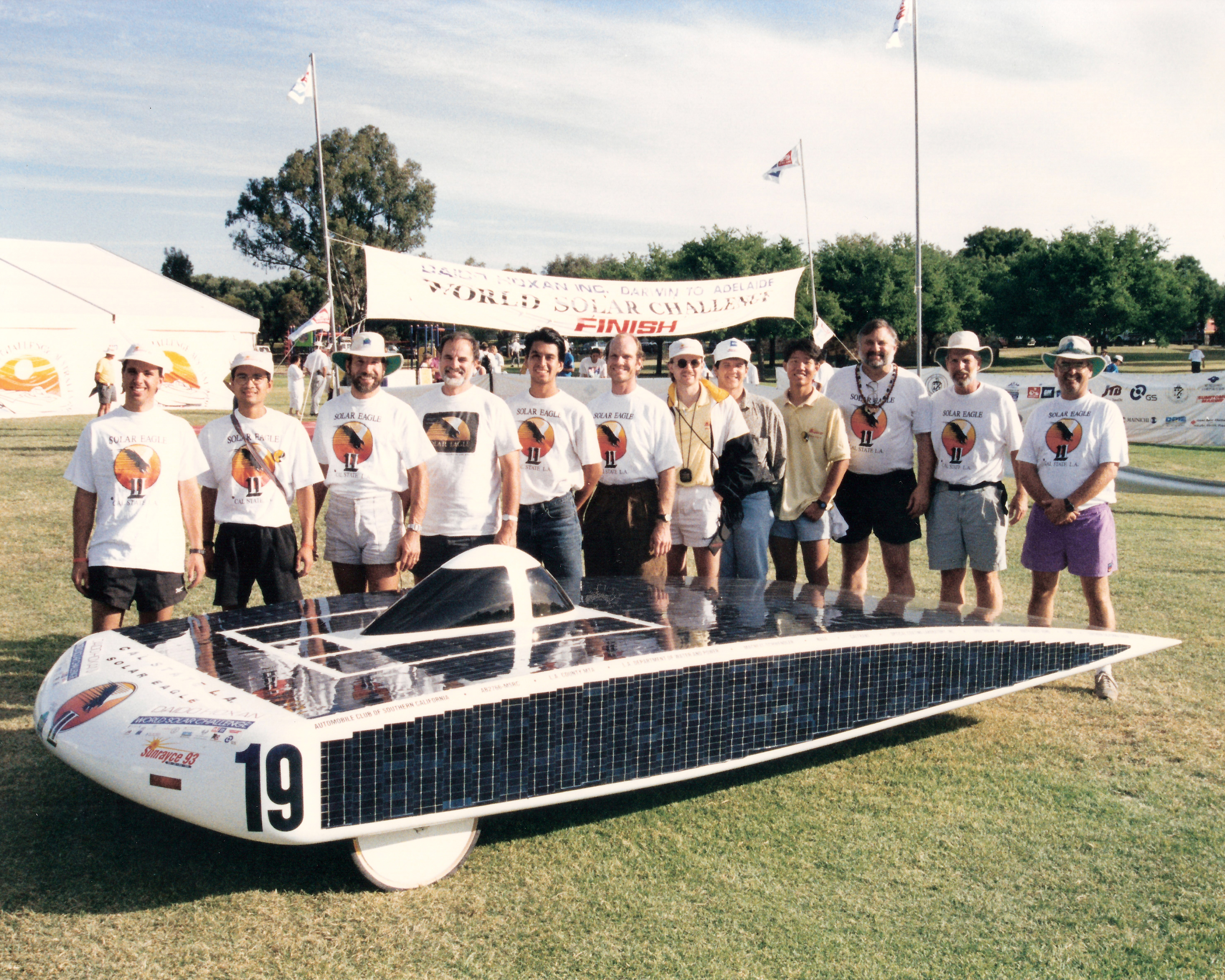
World Solar Challenge
Adelaide, Australia

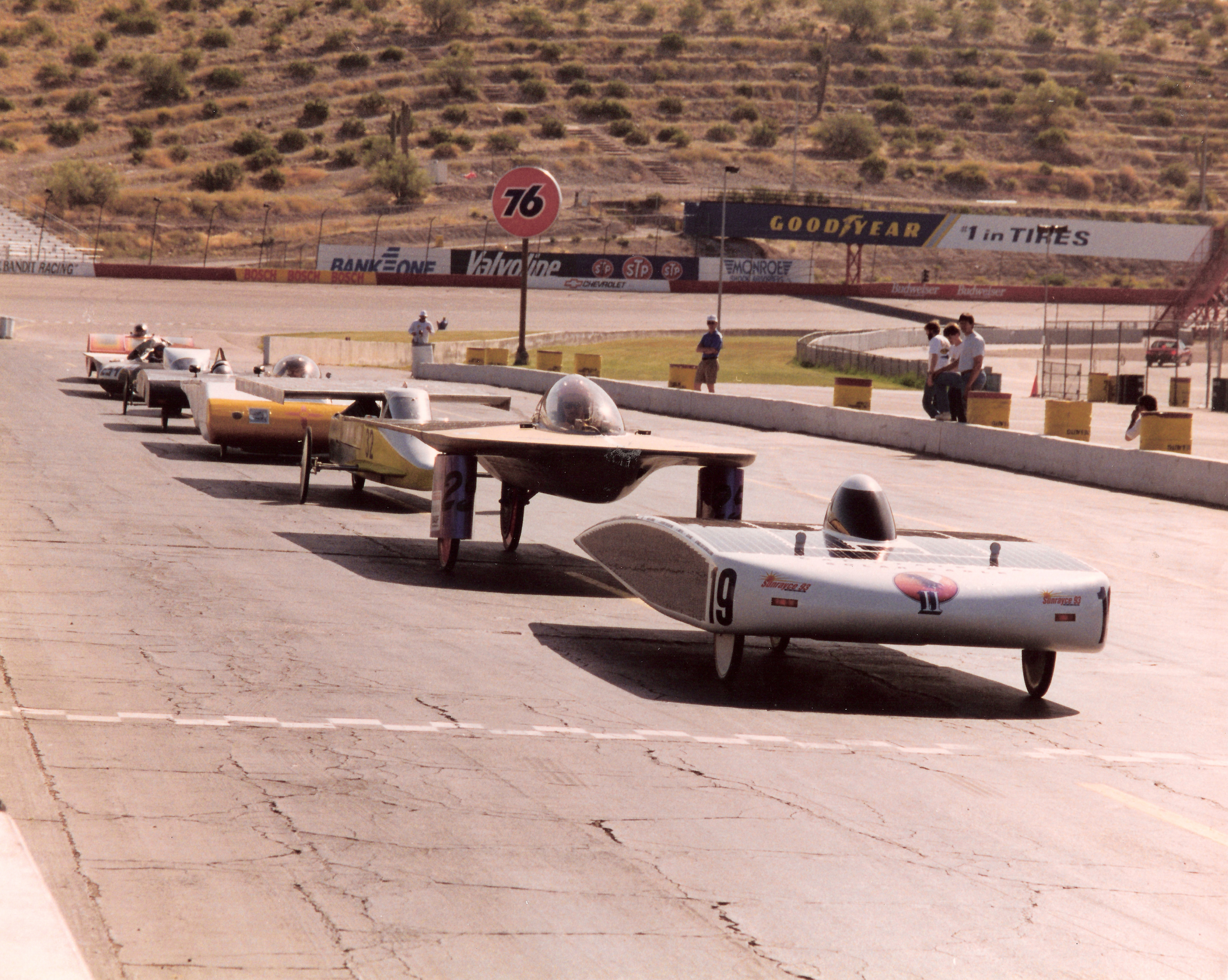
Phoenix, Arizona

== Solar Eagle III ==
Solar Eagle III
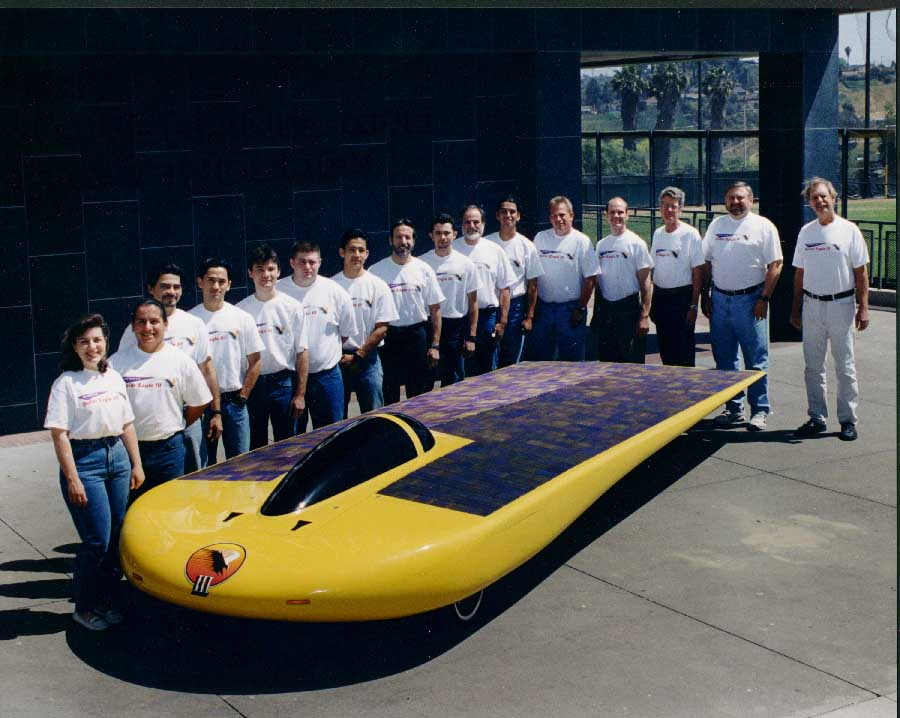
- GM Sunrayce USA

Technical specifications
- Chassis: Carbon fiber monocoque structure with carbon fiber skin with Nomex honeycomb core body
- Suspension (front): double A-arm
- Suspension (rear): swing arm
- Length: 5.9 m (19.2 ft)
- Width: 1.9 m (6.3 ft)
- Height: 0.94 m (3.1 ft)
- Wheelbase: 104 in (2.6 m)
- Electric motor: Wheel motor: (NGM-SC-M100) and controller (NGM-SC-C100) by New Generation Motor Corp. or Belt drive: DC brushless motor (BRLS8) and controller (110H) by Solectria Corp.
- Battery: 108-volt system (9x 12-volt batteries by U.S. Battery Mfg. Co.) (weight: 139 kg (307 lb))
- Weight: 194 kg (427 lb) (without driver and batteries)
- Brakes: Front: mechanical hydraulic Rear: regenerative
- Tires: Bridgestone Ecopia; Tire rolling resistance: 0.0045

Competition history
- Competition: GM Sunrayce USA 1997 (1st place)

- 1997: Solar Eagle III - GM Sunrayce USA: 1st place
- On display at Cal State LA

Solar Eagle III was the third solar-powered electric vehicle built by Cal State L.A. Again engineered by students under the guidance of faculty and staff, the Solar Eagle III drew from the first two designs, the Solar Eagle and the Solar Eagle II.

On Saturday, June 28, 1997, the Solar Eagle III won Sunrayce 97, the national intercollegiate solar car race. Solar Eagle III set a Sunrayce record for average speed of 43.29 miles per hour (69.67 km/h) and finished nearly 20 minutes ahead of second-place Massachusetts Institute of Technology (MIT). The combined team of Stanford University/UC Berkeley finished third. Texas A&M, whose team used the molds from Cal State L.A.'s Solar Eagle II to build their entry, the MACH V, finished fourth.

During the 1,230 mile course from Indianapolis to Colorado Springs, the Solar Eagle III suffered no breakdowns or other unscheduled stops, a distinction shared with only the Texas A&M MACH V.

=== Technical specifications ===
- Weight: 427 pounds (without driver and batteries)
- Length: 19.2 feet
- Width: 6.3 feet
- Height: 3.1 feet
- Rolling Chassis: carbon fiber monocoque structure
- Body and Solar Panel: carbon fiber skin with Nomex honeycomb core Solar Cells: 762 terrestrial grade silicon cells (4.05" x 3.94") by Siemens wired in four parallel strings
- Panel Voltage: 85-volts peak string voltage
- Tire Rolling Resistance: 0.0045
- Drag Coefficient: 0.15
- Wheel Base: 104 inches
- Wheels and Tires: wheels have composite centers with aluminum rims; tires are Bridgestone Ecopia
- Brakes and Suspension: front brakes are mechanical hydraulic; regenerative rear brakes. Suspension is double A-arm in the front and swing arm in the rear
- Batteries: 108-volt system with nine 12-volt batteries by U.S. Battery Manufacturing Company; weight-307 lbs
- Motor System: two interchangeable motor systems:
  1. Wheel motor (NGM-SC-M100) and controller (NGM-SC-C100) by New Generation Motor Corporation
  2. DC brushless motor (BRLS8) and controller (110H) by Solectria Corporation with belt drive
